= Whitefin chimaera =

Conservation status
- Least Concern (IUCN 3.1)

Scientific classification
- Kingdom: Animalia
- Phylum: Chordata
- Class: Chondrichthyes
- Subclass: Holocephali
- Order: Chimaeriformes
- Family: Chimaeridae
- Genus: Chimaera
- Species: C. argiloba

Binomial name
- Chimaera argiloba Last, W. T. White & Pogonoski, 2008

Species of fish

The whitefin chimaera (Chimaera argiloba) is a species of fish in the family Chimaeridae. It is found in the Indian Ocean to the NW of Australia, with a restricted distribution. Chimaera argiloba inhabits marine waters from a depth range of 370–520 m. It is abundant within its range.

== Classification/species ==
The Chimaera argiloba, more commonly known as the Whitefin chimaera, comes from the genus Chimaera, which in Latin translates to 'marine monster'. The species name, argiloba, is in reference to the Greek meaning for 'white', and loba, a Latin word, refers to a 'rounded projection'. This full species name is derived from the unique posterior part of the first dorsal fin, which is both white and rounded, extending outwards.

=== Differences from other species in Chimaera genus ===
The genus Chimaera includes ten nominal species presented by Carl Linnaeus, which include Chimaera obscura, C. cubana, C. panthera, C. fulva, C. lignaria, C. jordani, C. macrospina, C. monstrosa, C. owstoni, and C. phantasma. C. argiloba shares the most similarities to C. phantasma, a species most commonly found in the northwestern Pacific. These two species only have slight disparities in morphologies and color.

C. argiloba is different from C. panther and C. owstoni in their color schemes and pattern distributions. Where C. argiloba is uniformly grey-silver, the other two species have a standout dark pattern. Additionally, C. lignaria have a lavender blue color scheme, and C. macrospina, C. fulva, C. jordani, and C. obscura all have dark brown exteriors.

== Characteristics ==
The genus Chimaera is part of the larger family Chimaeridae, which also includes the genus Hydrolagus. This genus differs from Chimaera in that these species do not have anal fins. Chimaera argiloba possess a medium length snout, ranging from 13.7-17.3 cm. From a dorso-ventral view, the snout is narrowly pointed, but is broadly pointed from a lateral point of view. On average, the whitefin chimaera has a horizontal head length of 10.7 cm, and a vertical height of 0.68 times the horizontal head length. In total, C. argiloba has a body length of 40 cm and a total length of more than 90 cm. Another prominent characteristic is its large gill opening that is separated with a posterior flap that protrudes from the head base, and is interconnected with the back of the gill cover by a short tube. Color-wise, C. argiloba is grey-silver, both laterally and dorsally. On its ventral side, the color has a slightly paler hue compared to the rest of its body.

== Distribution ==
Chimaera argiloba is most commonly found in northwestern Australia in the Indian Ocean. This particular species does not have a broad distribution, but there have been known findings off the shores of North Caledonia and Indonesia. C. argiloba reside in waters at a depth of 370 meters, and even going deeper ranging to depths of 520 meters.

== Threats ==
C. argiloba is not widely used for commercial distribution purposes, but is subjected to other minor threats. One arising threat is the capture of this species by fisheries originally set on teleost fish and prawns off the coast of northwestern Australia. Companies such as the North West Slope Trawl Fishery and Commonwealth Western Deepwater Trawl Fishery operate around these areas where the Whitefin chimaera reside. They implement trawl gear that go to depths greater than 300 m, having the potential to inadvertently catch C. argioloba. However, these two fisheries have relatively low activity, and when they do catch these species, the whitefin chimaera are kept alive and usually released back into the waters.
