= Hydrolagus lusitanicus =

Portuguese chimaera

Conservation status
- Least Concern (IUCN 3.1)

Scientific classification
- Kingdom: Animalia
- Phylum: Chordata
- Class: Chondrichthyes
- Subclass: Holocephali
- Order: Chimaeriformes
- Family: Chimaeridae
- Genus: Hydrolagus
- Species: H. lusitanicus

Binomial name
- Hydrolagus lusitanicus (Moura, T., Figueiredo, I., Bordalo-Machado, P., Almeida, C. and Gordo, L.S., 2005)

Species of fish

Hydrolagus lusitanicus, commonly known as the Portuguese chimaera, is a species of fish of the family Chimaeridae. It is a deep sea species which has been found on the continental slope in the north-east Atlantic, with only 22 specimens recorded as of 2024.

== Description ==
Hydrolagus lusitanicus has a stout body which tapers from a large head to its short tail. It has a rose to light brown coloured body, with whitish patches on its head and violet-blue fins. The size of its eyes is less than 20% of its total head length. It has a maximum known precaudal length of 118 centimetres (46 in).

Between H. lusitanicus and Hydrolagus pallidus there is a genetic divergence of 1.6%, meaning that it is possible that H. lusitanicus is a colour variant.

== Distribution and habitat ==
Hydrolagus lusitanicus occurs at depths of 1,600 metres (5,200 ft) and deeper. It is native to the waters of Portugal from Figueira da Foz to Algarve.

== Reproduction ==
Hydrolagus lusitanicus is oviparous.

== Conservation ==
Hydrolagus lusitanicus is categorised as least concern on the IUCN Red List as its depth is beyond that of the regular depth of deepsea trawling fisheries, with no known impact of fishing upon the population. It is occasionally taken as a bycatch of fisheries targeting Black scabbardfish.
