= Chimaera orientalis =

Conservation status
- Data Deficient (IUCN 3.1)

Scientific classification
- Kingdom: Animalia
- Phylum: Chordata
- Class: Chondrichthyes
- Subclass: Holocephali
- Order: Chimaeriformes
- Family: Chimaeridae
- Genus: Chimaera
- Species: C. orientalis

Binomial name
- Chimaera orientalis Angulo, López, Bussing & Murase, 2014

Species of fish

Chimaera orientalis, the Eastern Pacific black chimaera, is a bathydemersal chimaera found in the Eastern Pacific Ocean, specifically Peru and Costa Rica.

== Description ==
Chimaera orientalis has several general characteristics, such as the presence of anal fin, tall first dorsal spine with short base, long interdorsal space, long pectoral fins, long pelvic claspers, and dark brown-colored body and darker fins with no distinctive patterns. The only specimen ever caught has a maximum total length of 17.6 cm.

== Distribution & habitat ==
This chimaera possibly inhabits the depth of 560–1138 m.
