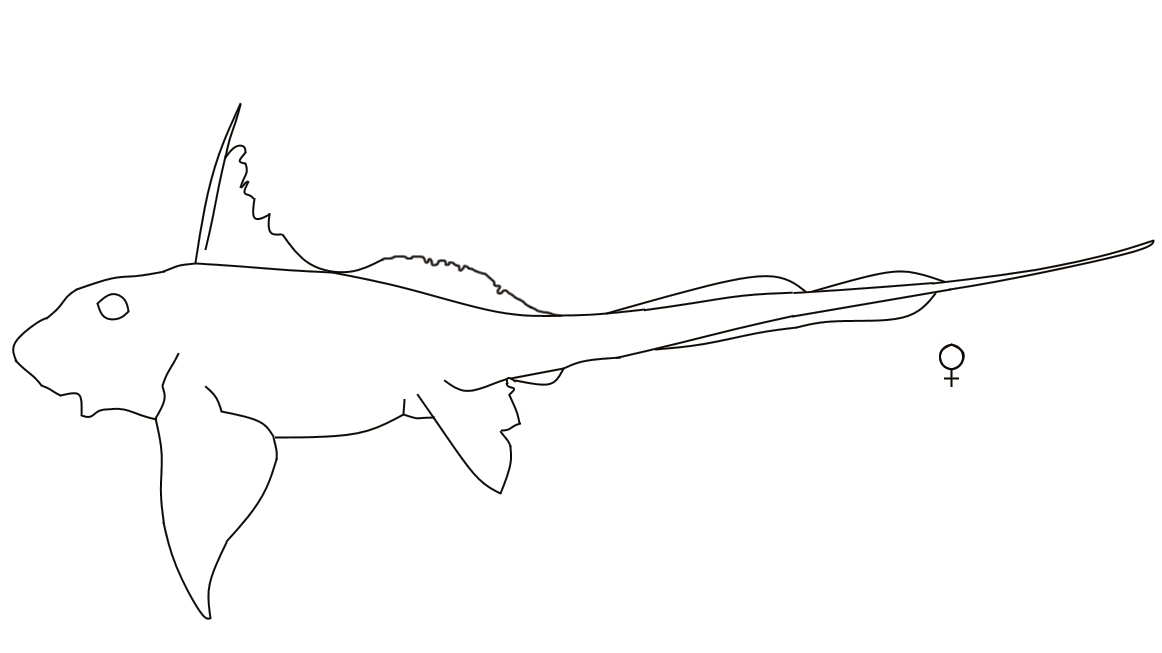

Conservation status
- Least Concern (IUCN 3.1)

Scientific classification
- Kingdom: Animalia
- Phylum: Chordata
- Class: Chondrichthyes
- Subclass: Holocephali
- Order: Chimaeriformes
- Family: Chimaeridae
- Genus: Hydrolagus
- Species: H. alphus

Binomial name
- Hydrolagus alphus Quaranta, Didier, Long & Ebert, 2006

= Whitespot ghost shark =

Species of cartilaginous fish

The whitespot ghost shark (Hydrolagus alphus) is a chimaera species in the family Chimaeridae, which lives in parts of the Galápagos Islands in the southeast Pacific Ocean. It lives in waters with smooth slopes and tiny pebbles and grows to a total length of around 40–50 cm (16–20 in).

== Discovery ==
The whitespot ghost shark was first described in 2006 by Kimberly Quaranta, Dominique Didier, Douglas Long, and David Ebert in Zootaxa. The specific name, alphus, is Latin and refers to the white spot on its skin. Because the species' habitat is too rough for trawls to operate in, the species has only been discovered using submersibles.

== Description ==
According to the International Union for Conservation of Nature (IUCN), of the two specimens that were caught and examined, one, a female, had a body length of 24.4 centimeters (9.6 in) and a total length of 48 cm (19 in), and the other, a male, had a body length of 24.9 cm (9.8 in) and a total length of 41.9 cm (16.5 in). The male examined was an adult, while the female was not fully grown yet. The chimaera has a single white spot above its pectoral fin about 4–6% the size of its body, after which it is named; aside from this, the chimaera is brown in color. With a tint of blue, its paired fins are darker in the center and lighter on the outside. It is lighter in color in the area behind its pectoral fin and its second dorsal fin. Its width gradually reduces from its body to its narrow tail.

The whitespot ghost shark's skin is smooth throughout, without any scales. It has two dorsal fins; the first is triangular and long, with a spine starting around its midpoint fin and extending far out. The second dorsal fin is also long, but is lower. Like all members in its genus, the species lacks an anal fin. Its head and eyes are both large, with its eyes being about two-fifths the size of its head and green in color. A groove connects a corner of its mouth to its nostrils, which are located further front than its mouth and are large. The claspers of males, relatively small, split halfway from their innermost point and have denticles at the tip.

== Behavior and habitat ==
A benthopelagic species, the whitespot ghost shark inhabits waters close to the sea floor, no further than 3 meters (9.8 ft) from it, and lives at depths of 630–907 m (2,067–2,976 ft). Its habitat is on steep slopes and boulders on the continental slope and in the bathyal zone. In particular, it is found in "areas of high rocky relief containing volcanic boulders, cobbles, and pebbles, interspersed with patches of sand and silt," the same environment as Hydrolagus mccoskeri, the Galápagos ghostshark. It is carnivorous, feeding on worms, shrimp, crabs, and mollusks that live in the benthic zone.

== Distribution and conservation ==
The whitespot ghost shark lives in the northeast Pacific Ocean, in the waters of the Galapagos Islands, and has only been observed or caught in four different areas of the islands. Although unconfirmed, it is probable that the species is endemic to the islands, particularly due to the number of fish known to be endemic there. The species does not face any major threats, due to its habitat being very difficult to fish in and because no fisheries in its range operate in waters as deep as the species lives. Its range is protected as part of the Galápagos Marine Reserve, which covers an area of 133,000 km^{2} (51,000 sq mi) and makes industrial fishing forbidden, although artisanal fishing is still permitted. People who violate these regulations often do not face prosecution, and the rules are not strongly enforced. It is listed as least concern by the IUCN.
