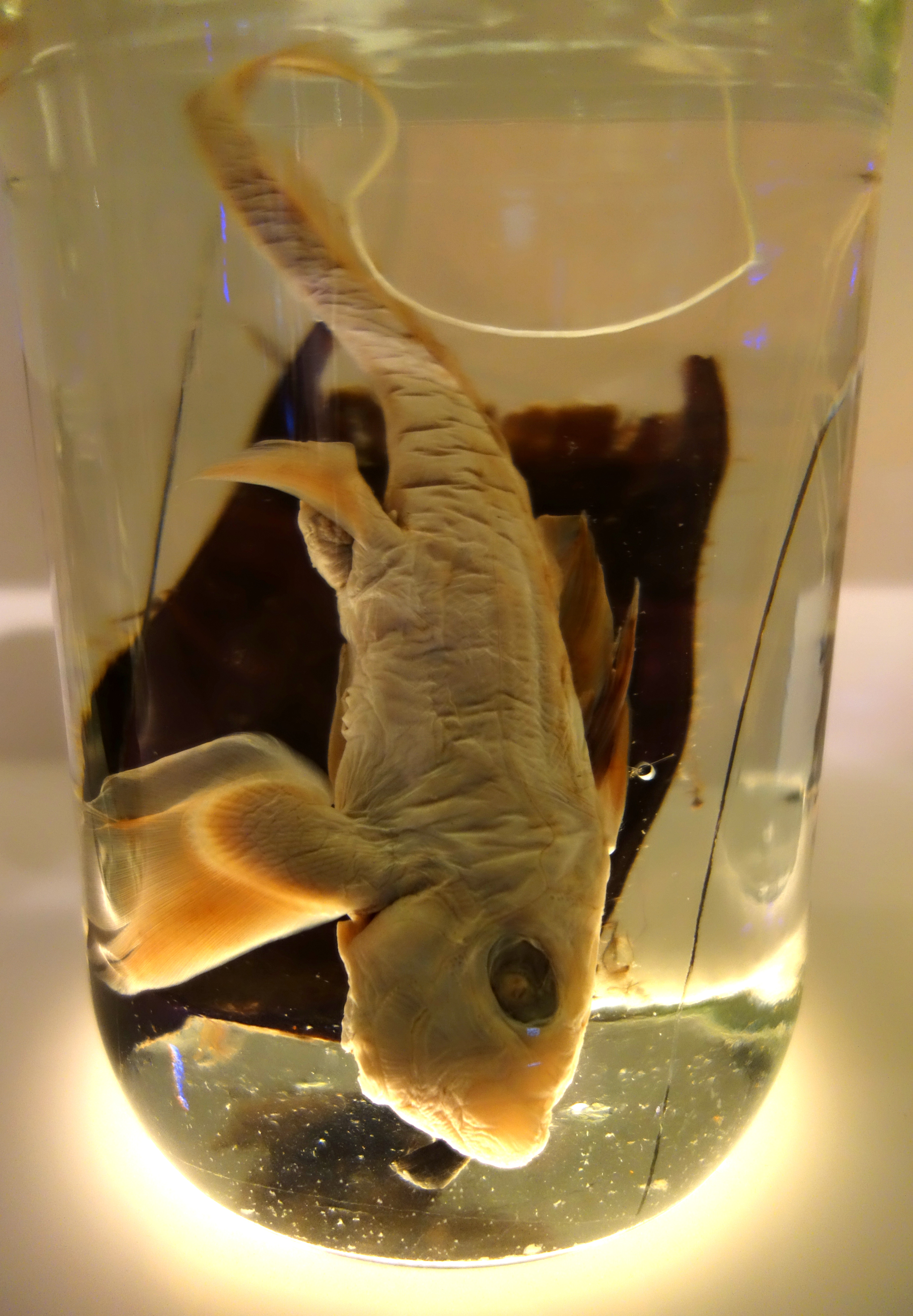

Conservation status
- Least Concern (IUCN 3.1)

Scientific classification
- Kingdom: Animalia
- Phylum: Chordata
- Class: Chondrichthyes
- Subclass: Holocephali
- Order: Chimaeriformes
- Family: Chimaeridae
- Genus: Chimaera
- Species: C. carophila

Binomial name
- Chimaera carophila Kemper, Ebert, Naylor & Didier, 2014

= Chimaera carophila =

Species of fish

Chimaera carophila, the brown chimaera is a marine cartilaginous fish in the subclass of holocephali, which resides in the Southwest Pacific Ocean surrounding New Zealand. C. carophila was first observed in 2014. The brown chimaera's notable features are its large eyes, a relatively short first dorsal fin and spine, a soft rounded snout, and a pale brown body color.

== Distribution ==
The brown chimaera can be found between depths of 846–1350m, but they are most commonly found around 1000m below sea level. C. carophila are distributed in the plateaus and slopes of deep water near New Zealand. They are found in the Southwest Pacific in plateaus such as Challenger Plateau, Chatham Slope and its rise, Hikurangi Trough, Campbell Plateau, and Bounty Plateau.

== Distinguishing characteristics ==
Chimaera carophila differs from C. fulva, C. macrospina, and C. obscura in its geographic distribution, certain morphological characteristics, and its coloration. Morphological differences include shorter pelvic claspers, a shorter first dorsal fin and dorsal fin spines, and a longer caudal dorsal margin and ventral margin.

=== Size ===
The total length of C. carophila is a minimum of 1035 mm in adulthood, with a body length proportion of 599 mm. Adult males' total length ranges from 740–975 mm and adult females' ranges from 855–1035 mm. Juvenile females' total length ranges from 277–759 mm and juvenile males' ranges from 410–835 mm.

=== Coloration ===
Preserved specimens of the brown chimaera have a uniform pale brown color, but coloration of fresh and live specimens is unknown. The coloration of preserved specimens includes "a uniform pale brown; faint longitudinal striping visible on tail; ventral snout and mouth darker; grayish-white around upper portion of mouth; pectoral and pelvic fins brownish-purple; first dorsal fin dark brown, sometimes with a purplish hue, darker at posterior margin; second dorsal fin pale brown basally, darker brown distally; caudal and anal fin pale brown; caudal filament beige; adult claspers dark brown-purple with whitish tips; juvenile claspers light brown; spine brown."

== Diet ==
Chimaera carophila diets primarily consist of benthic-dwelling invertebrates, but they are also suspected to be detritivorous. One study found benthic invertebrates, including gastropods, barnacles, and polychaetes, in the stomachs of two specimens. In the same study, they found other fish, cephalopods, and crustaceans in only one of the specimens.

== Life history ==
Chimaera carophila is oviparous, meaning fertilization occurs internally, and the female sheds a zygote. Species of chimaerids are shown to segregate by sex. Females were found at greater depths than males. Studies show that this could be due to intraspecies competition and sexual conflict. Studies have found that juveniles are found at greater depths as well. There is not enough information about the reproduction, growth, and development of this species.

== Conservation efforts ==
IUCN lists C. carophila as Least Concern. Further information is required regarding population size and distribution, but the distribution is considered small. Threats to this species include fishing and harvesting.
