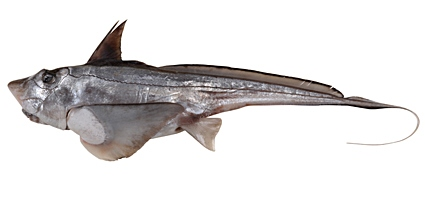

Conservation status
- Near Threatened (IUCN 3.1)

Scientific classification
- Kingdom: Animalia
- Phylum: Chordata
- Class: Chondrichthyes
- Subclass: Holocephali
- Order: Chimaeriformes
- Family: Chimaeridae
- Genus: Chimaera
- Species: C. ogilbyi

Binomial name
- Chimaera ogilbyi Waite, 1898

Synonyms
- Chimaera tsengi Fang & Wang, 1932; Hydrolagus ogilbyi (Waite, 1898); Hydrolagus lemures (Whitley, 1939); Phasmichthys lemures Whitley, 1939

= Ogilby's ghostshark =

Species of cartilaginous fish

Ogilby's ghostshark (Chimaera ogilbyi), also known as the whitefish, is a species of chimaera, native to the waters of Australia and southern Indonesia. It lives near the ocean floor on the continental shelf and continental slope 120–350 m (390–1,150 ft) deep. It reaches a maximum size of 85.0 cm (33.5 in). Reproduction is oviparous and eggs are encased in horny shells. It reaches maturity between 64–70 cm (25–28 in) in length. It is listed as a near-threatened species by the International Union for Conservation of Nature (IUCN) due to steep declines in population in areas affected by trawling.

Ogilby's ghostshark was formerly placed in the genus Hydrolagus based on its appearance, but a 2018 genetic study of mitochondrial DNA markers found that it was nested within the genus Chimaera. Alongside H. ogilbyi, three other putative Hydrolagus populations defined by mitochondrial DNA were found to nest within Chimaera: Hydrolagus lemures (from Western Australia), and two unnamed populations from southern Indonesia and northern Papua New Guinea. These four populations are indistinguishable from each other according to nuclear DNA and morphological (appearance)-based data. As a result, the four populations were combined into one species, for which Chimaera ogilbyi is the oldest name.

Specimens formerly placed in the species Hydrolagus lemures (the bight ghostshark or blackfin ghostshark) are found in the waters of Australia from Queensland to Western Australia where, near the ocean floor of the continental shelf and upper slope. Their depth range is between 146 and 510 m (479 and 1,673 ft) from the surface. They reach a maximum total length of 88.0 cm (34.6 in).
