= Chimaera stellata =

Conservation status
- Data Deficient (IUCN 3.1)

Scientific classification
- Kingdom: Animalia
- Phylum: Chordata
- Class: Chondrichthyes
- Subclass: Holocephali
- Order: Chimaeriformes
- Family: Chimaeridae
- Genus: Chimaera
- Species: C. stellata

Binomial name
- Chimaera stellata Teramura, Senou, & Hirase, 2024

Species of fish

Chimaera stellata, the stellated chimaera, is a type of chimaera of the family Chimaeridae found exclusively in Okinawa Trough, East China Sea, from only one specimen.

== Description ==
This chimaera species is distinguishable from its closest congener (Chimaera owstoni) from several characteristics: stockier body, robust head, slightly concaved dorsal spine, teardrop-shaped pectoral fin, square-shaped anal fin with pale gray distal margin, darkish ventral surface, and walnut brown-colored body with lighter spots. The only specimen ever reported, which is a female, has a maximum total length (TL) of around 88.7 cm (34.9 in).

== Habitat and distribution ==
After its discovery, stellated chimaera has been believed to be an endemic in Japan, specifically around Okinawa, and there are still no details about its habitat depth.
