= Galápagos ghostshark =

Conservation status
- Least Concern (IUCN 3.1)

Scientific classification
- Kingdom: Animalia
- Phylum: Chordata
- Class: Chondrichthyes
- Subclass: Holocephali
- Order: Chimaeriformes
- Family: Chimaeridae
- Genus: Hydrolagus
- Species: H. mccoskeri

Binomial name
- Hydrolagus mccoskeri Barnett, Didier, Long & Ebert, 2006

Species of cartilaginous fish

The Galápagos ghostshark (Hydrolagus mccoskeri) is a chimaera species in the family Chimaeridae, likely endemic to the Galápagos Islands. It was discovered by John E. McCosker in 1995 and described in 2006, scientifically named in honor of McCosker. This chimaera has a brown compressed, elongate body. The holotype and paratype of the species, both juvenile females, had a total length of 38.1 centimetres (15.0 in) and 22.7 centimetres (8.9 in), respectively. It lives in rocky habitats close to the sea floor, in waters about 395–510 metres (1,296–1,673 ft) deep. It is listed as least concern on the IUCN Red List.

== Discovery and taxonomy ==
John E. McCosker, an expert in ichthyology, discovered the Galápagos ghostshark in 1995, on his 50th birthday. McCosker later requested for Dominique Didier, a biology professor at Millersville University, to assist with describing the new species. Didier and several of her colleagues begun researching the species in 2005. It was described by Lewis A. K. Barnett, Dominique Didier, Douglas Long, and David A. Ebert in October 2006, and the finding of the species was published in the scientific journal Zootaxa. The specific name of the species was named as such in honor of McCosker. Didier said, "Determining Hydrolagus mccoskeri was a new species of ratfish wasn't difficult, but going through all the verification steps required a great deal of time."

The holotype of the species is a juvenile female, found by John McCosker, R. Grant Gilmore, and Bruce Robinson on November 17, 1995, southeast of San Cristóbal Island. The paratype is also a juvenile female, discovered by John McCosker and John Ross on July 6, 1998, located close to Española Island. Both of these type specimens were found using two submersibles, Johnson Sea-Link II and R/V Seward Johnson. Due to the rough, rocky habitat of the species, trawling, the traditional way of collecting fish for study, was unsuitable. Instead, the specimens were collected in the submarines using a suction hose. This allowed "individuals to survive and retain fresh coloration and natural morphology for observation at the surface."

== Description ==
This ghostshark has a compressed, elongate body, which thins out to its tail. It is medium-brown in color, with a lighter underside and a darker upperside. Most of its fins are dark, including its two dorsal fins, while its lower tail is white. It is covered with blotches of white, which can be circular, narrow, or elongate in shape. Of the two type specimens, the holotype had a total length (TL) of 38.1 centimetres (15.0 in) and a body length (BDL) of 21.1 centimetres (8.3 in), while the paratype was slightly smaller, with a TL of 22.7 centimetres (8.9 in) and BDL of 10.7 centimetres (4.2 in). The species has smooth skin and lacks scales. It has two dorsal fins, the first of which is upright and triangular and the second of which is longer and lower. The end of its tail fin has a "whip-like" fiber at the end of it and it lacks an anal fin. It has three pairs of plates inside of its mouth for teeth. Males have multi-pointed external sex organs. Other characteristics of the species include a small head, a round snout, large green eyes, and nostrils linked to its mouth with a flap-covered groove.

== Ecology ==
The Galápagos ghostshark has been observed to occur on steep slopes, in areas containing stones and boulders with dispersed sand and silt. The nine specimens in the original description were found in depths of 396.25–505.97 metres (1,300.0–1,660.0 ft). This is a shallower range than most species in Hydrolagus, but the two most closely related species to the Galápagos ghostshark – the spotted ratfish (Hydrolagus colliei) and the dark ghostshark (Hydrolagus novaezealandiae) – do live in shallower depths. The specimens were found close to the sea floor, in groups or alone. The species is a carnivore, feeding on aquatic worms, mollusks, and crustaceans.

== Distribution and conservation ==
H. mccoskeri is likely endemic to the Galápagos Islands in the southeastern Pacific Ocean. When the species was described in 2006, there were nine recorded instances of it at four locations: Fernandina Island, Española Island (paratype), Marchena Island, and San Cristóbal Island (holotype). The species' population is unknown. Most fisheries in its range operate in shallower waters than its preferred depth; no deepwater fisheries are present in its range. Its habitat cannot be trawled in because it is too rocky. Its entire range is within the Galápagos Marine Reserve; in the reserve, industrial fishing is prohibited, but artisanal fishing is still allowed. Fishers frequently violate these regulations, fishing illegally, and they are often not prosecuted for such activities. The International Union for Conservation of Nature (IUCN) said that the species requires further studying of its population and threats before receiving an assessment. It is listed as least concern on the IUCN Red List.
