= Chimaera compacta =

Conservation status
- Data Deficient (IUCN 3.1)

Scientific classification
- Kingdom: Animalia
- Phylum: Chordata
- Class: Chondrichthyes
- Subclass: Holocephali
- Order: Chimaeriformes
- Family: Chimaeridae
- Genus: Chimaera
- Species: C. compacta

Binomial name
- Chimaera compacta Iglésias, Kemper & Naylor, 2021

Species of fish

Chimaera compacta is a bathydemersal chimaera found in southern Indian Ocean.

== Description ==
The species has a substantial head with a short snout, long stocky trunk, long pelvic fin, firm non-deciduous skin, and brown-colored body with yellow blotches. The maximum total length of this species is around 84.3 cm (33.2 in) for the female specimens.

== Habitat & distribution ==
This chimaera appears to inhabit depths of 595–655 m (1,950–2,150 ft).
