= Chimaera buccaginella =

Scientific classification
- Kingdom: Animalia
- Phylum: Chordata
- Class: Chondrichthyes
- Subclass: Holocephali
- Order: Chimaeriformes
- Family: Chimaeridae
- Genus: Chimaera
- Species: C. buccaginella

Binomial name
- Chimaera buccaginella Clerkin, Ebert & Kemper, 2017

Species of fish

Chimaera buccaginella is a bathydemersal chimaera found in the Southwestern Indian Ocean.

== Description ==
The species has a light tan-colored and stocky body, a short trunk, a very straight spine, and non-deciduous skin. The maximum total length of this species is around 86 cm (34 in) for males and 76.5 cm (30.1 in) for females.

== Habitat and distribution ==
This chimaera possibly inhabits depths of 495–960 m (1,624–3,150 ft).
