= Bigeye chimaera =

Conservation status
- Least Concern (IUCN 3.1)

Scientific classification
- Kingdom: Animalia
- Phylum: Chordata
- Class: Chondrichthyes
- Subclass: Holocephali
- Order: Chimaeriformes
- Family: Chimaeridae
- Genus: Hydrolagus
- Species: H. macrophthalmus

Binomial name
- Hydrolagus macrophthalmus F. de Buen, 1959

Species of fish

The bigeye chimaera (Hydrolagus macrophthalmus) is a species of fish in the family Chimaeridae. It is found in Chile and possibly Ecuador. Its natural habitat is open seas. It is only known from the preabyssal zone off Valparaíso, and may occur as far south as Valdivia and as far north as the Galápagos Islands and Nicaragua and Guatemala, so may be more widespread, but species research is not abundant.
