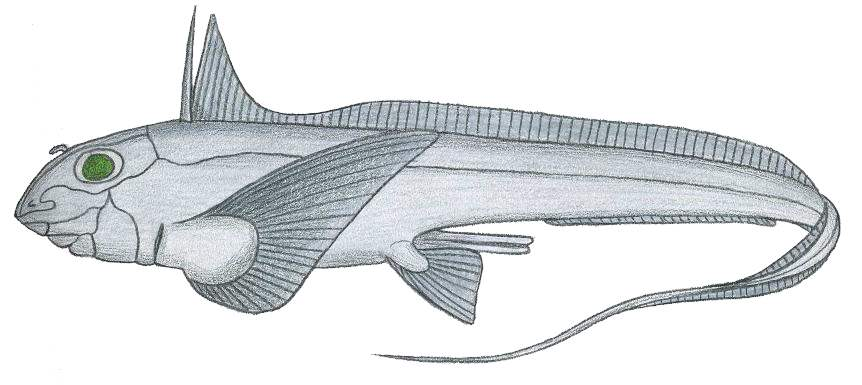

Conservation status
- Least Concern (IUCN 3.1)

Scientific classification
- Kingdom: Animalia
- Phylum: Chordata
- Class: Chondrichthyes
- Subclass: Holocephali
- Order: Chimaeriformes
- Family: Chimaeridae
- Genus: Chimaera
- Species: C. cubana

Binomial name
- Chimaera cubana Howell-Rivero, 1936

= Cuban chimaera =

Species of fish

The Cuban chimaera (Chimaera cubana) is a species of fish in the family Chimaeridae. It is found in Colombia, Cuba, and Puerto Rico. Its natural habitat is open seas. It is threatened by habitat loss.
