= Canadodus =

Canadodus Temporal range: Chattian

Scientific classification
- Kingdom: Animalia
- Phylum: Chordata
- Class: Chondrichthyes
- Subclass: Holocephali
- Order: Chimaeriformes
- Family: Chimaeridae
- Genus: †Canadodus
- Species: †C. suntoki

Binomial name
- †Canadodus suntoki Popov et al., 2020

Extinct genus of chimaeras

Canadodus is an extinct genus of chimaerid that inhabited British Columbia during the Oligocene epoch. It contains one species, C. suntoki.
