= Hydrolagus eidolon =

Scientific classification
- Kingdom: Animalia
- Phylum: Chordata
- Class: Chondrichthyes
- Subclass: Holocephali
- Order: Chimaeriformes
- Family: Chimaeridae
- Genus: Hydrolagus
- Species: H. eidolon

Binomial name
- Hydrolagus eidolon (Jordan & Hubbs, 1925)

Species of fish

Hydrolagus eidolon is a species of chimaera in the family Chimaeridae. It is native to the Northwest Pacific and Japan in deep water bathydersal environments.

It is oviparous and lays eggs encased in horny shells.
