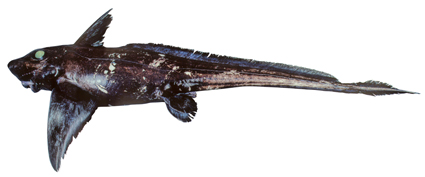
- Hydrolagus homonycteris

Conservation status
- Least Concern (IUCN 3.1)

Scientific classification
- Kingdom: Animalia
- Phylum: Chordata
- Class: Chondrichthyes
- Subclass: Holocephali
- Order: Chimaeriformes
- Family: Chimaeridae
- Genus: Hydrolagus
- Species: H. homonycteris

Binomial name
- Hydrolagus homonycteris Didier, 2008

= Black ghostshark =

Species of cartilaginous fish

The black ghostshark (Hydrolagus homonycteris), also known as the black chimaera, is a chimaera species within the family Chimaeridae. The species lives off the coasts of Australia and New Zealand, in the southwestern Pacific Ocean, in depths of 500–1,450 m (1,640–4,760 ft). It has a black or dark brown body; males have a total length of 108 cm (43 in). The species is closely related to the abyssal ghostshark. Although it is sometimes caught as a bycatch, it does not have any major threats and is listed as least concern by the International Union for Conservation of Nature (IUCN).

== Taxonomy and etymology ==
The black ghostshark was described by Dominique A. Didier in 2008. It is one of 23 species in the genus Hydrolagus. Its genus name, Hydrolagus, comes from the Greek words hydro, which means "water" and lagos, which means "hare". The specific name, homonycteris, is composed of the word homo, the Latin word for man, and nycteris, the word for bat. Its name was taken after Thomas A. Griffiths, a professor at Illinois Wesleyan University, whose students called him "bat man".

== Description ==
The black ghostshark can grow up to 66 cm (26 in) in body length, with a maximum total length of 108 cm (43 in) for males. Its body is dark in color, typically black or a dark shade of brown. Its eyes are large and its snout is slightly pointed. Its dorsal spine is large and it has round pelvic fins. Its claspers have areas of bristles on them and are somewhat short and thin. Its appearance is similar to that of the abyssal ghostshark, another species of chimaera to which it is closely related; however, the black ghostshark's dorsal spine is longer than that of the abyssal ghostshark and its claspers are darker and smaller.

== Distribution and habitat ==
The black ghostshark lives in the southwestern Pacific Ocean off the coasts of south-eastern Australia, from Portland, Victoria, to Ulladulla, New South Wales, covering the states of New South Wales, Tasmania, and Victoria. The species also occurs in New Zealand from the West Norfolk Ridge to the Campbell Plateau. In Australia, it lives in waters 870–1,450 m (2,850–4,760 ft) deep, while it lives at slightly shallower depths in New Zealand, at 500–1,400 m (1,600–4,600 ft). The species is found at the continental slope and seamounts.

== Threats and conservation ==
Throughout its New Zealand range, the black ghostshark is sometimes caught as a bycatch; a study showed the number of specimens caught gradually increasing from 1990 to 2010. It is generally caught from trawls and fisheries, which operate in deeper waters in New Zealand. It is also recorded to be caught intentionally in the country, although what the species can be used for there is unknown. In June 2018 the New Zealand Department of Conservation classified the black ghostshark as "Not Threatened" with the qualifier "Secure Overseas" under the New Zealand Threat Classification System.

In Australia, the species is also caught as a bycatch, but infrequently. South Tasman Rise Fishery, which was previously a threat to the species, closed in 2007, making the species less vulnerable in the Australian area. The species is safe to eat and has good quality flesh. At the current time, it does not have any major threats, so no conservation actions are taking place for the species and it is listed as least concern by the IUCN.
