= Marbled ghostshark =

Scientific classification
- Kingdom: Animalia
- Phylum: Chordata
- Class: Chondrichthyes
- Subclass: Holocephali
- Order: Chimaeriformes
- Family: Chimaeridae
- Genus: Hydrolagus
- Species: H. marmoratus

Binomial name
- Hydrolagus marmoratus Didier, 2008

Species of cartilaginous fish

The marbled ghostshark (Hydrolagus marmoratus) is a chimaera species in the family Chimaeridae, which lives in waters off the eastern coast of Australia.
