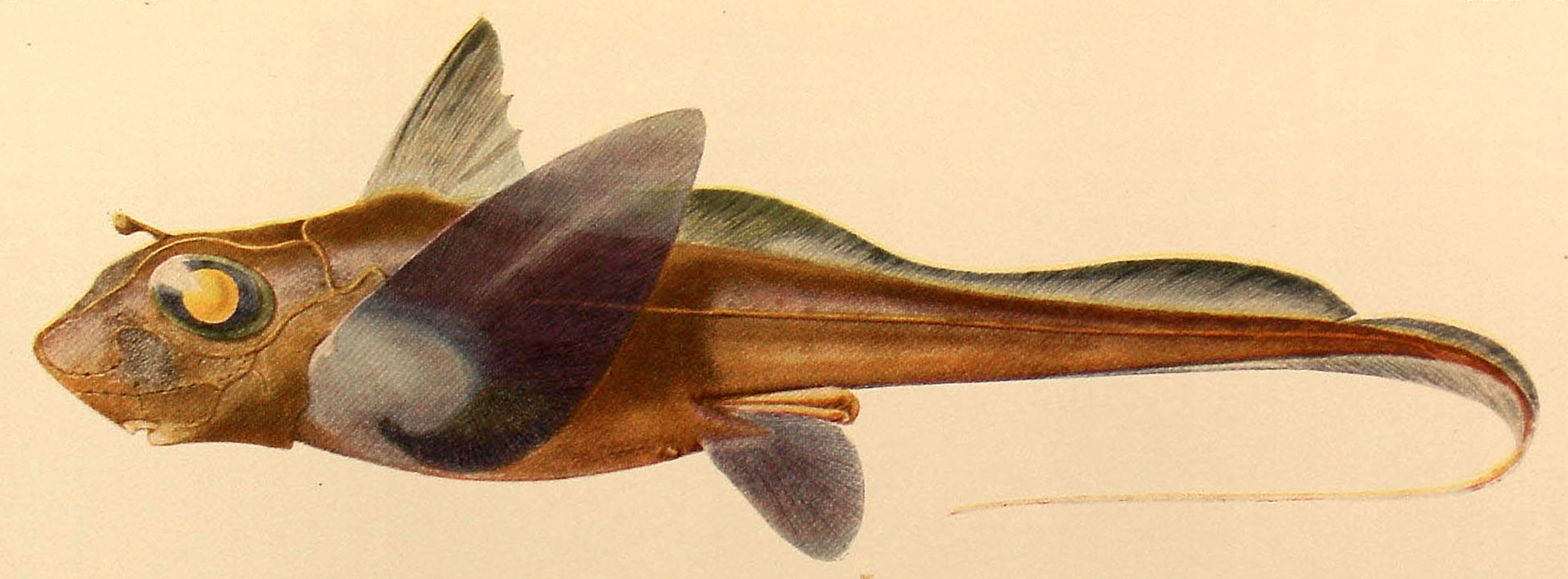

Conservation status
- Least Concern (IUCN 3.1)

Scientific classification
- Kingdom: Animalia
- Phylum: Chordata
- Class: Chondrichthyes
- Subclass: Holocephali
- Order: Chimaeriformes
- Family: Chimaeridae
- Genus: Hydrolagus
- Species: H. mirabilis

Binomial name
- Hydrolagus mirabilis (Collett, 1904)

= Large-eyed rabbitfish =

Species of fish

The large-eyed rabbitfish (Hydrolagus mirabilis) is a species of fish in the family Chimaeridae. It is found in several areas of the Atlantic Ocean and within the Mediterranean Sea.

== Distribution ==
There are reported sightings of Hydrolagus mirabilis that stretch from Southern Africa on the coast of Namibia all the way to the far north of Iceland. The most recent accounts come from Syrian waters (500m) within the eastern Mediterranean Sea and the Bay of Biscay between Spain and France. The family Chimaeridae is present worldwide within temperate to tropical waters, below 200m, but prefer to swim within coastal environments. Young members have a tendency to remain at lower depths (1000m) than the older members, who are more focused on inshore mating and migrations.

== Description ==
The size of this species ranges from 600–2000 mm, displaying sexual dimorphism where the females are significantly larger than the males. The large pectoral wing like fins on the sides of its body project it through the water and allow for additional lift, whilst the long tapered tail adds to its agility in the water. Members of the family Chimaeridae carry a venomous dorsal fin spine as a defense mechanism to ward off predators. Whilst members of the family have two dorsal fins, it is only the primary one that contains venom. Said fin is not fixed in place, but can instead be lifted up in cases when the fish is threatened. The venom itself is not deadly towards humans, but there have been cases where the spine penetrated deeply enough to require surgery. The eyes of the Hydrolagus mirabilis are approximately 35% of the total length of their head. The gill line of this species has a gill cover known as an operculum, which is able to open and close, and both keeps the respiratory system safe whilst collecting further dissolved oxygen to breathe. There are mixed reports on if this species has an anal fin. Some observations categorize the difference between this species and other members of its family is the absence of said fin, whilst others claim that it does have the anal fin and that it leads to the caudal fin.

The name 'Rabbit Fish' originates from its large tooth-plates within its upper and lower jaws, giving it a rabbit like appearance. This family is also often referred to as "Rat Fish" as well due to its long tapered tail . The combination of these parts resembling a variety of animals is what gave its family the name Chimaera - representing the creature by the same name in Greek mythology that combined a multitude of beasts.

== Reproduction ==
Adults have migration patterns across coastal plains of continents, where they will find their mate. The species then reproduces uses internal fertilization, when the male uses twin pectoral fins to clasp onto the female during the mating process. The tentaculum (often seen as a white bulge on the head), extends outward to keep the female from straying away. The species is oviparous, where eggs will hatch about 5–10 months after being laid. The egg laying process takes ~18–30 hours, where tendrils hold onto the eggs, dragging them along with the female's movements.

== Diet ==
The diet of the Hydrolagus mirabilis may vary greatly due to its abundance throughout the ocean, but it generally consists of small fish, polychaetes, molluscs, echinoderms, anemones, and small crustaceans.

== Uses ==
Members of this family are known to be rather distasteful in a meal, but some have placed value within the oils of the fish for commercial uses. The eggs of similar species have been commonly exploited and abused due to their long (5–10 month) hatching period. The Large Eyed Rabbit Fish was marked as near threatened due to overfishing in previous years in which caused a roughly 50% population loss, but is back to Least Concern Status.
