= Chimaera supapae =

Conservation status
- Least Concern (IUCN 3.1)

Scientific classification
- Kingdom: Animalia
- Phylum: Chordata
- Class: Chondrichthyes
- Subclass: Holocephali
- Order: Chimaeriformes
- Family: Chimaeridae
- Genus: Chimaera
- Species: C. supapae

Binomial name
- Chimaera supapae Ebert, Krajangdara, Fahmi & Kemper, 2024

Species of fish

Chimaera supapae, the Andaman shortnose chimaera, is a type of chimaera of the family Chimaeridae discovered exclusively in the Andaman Sea of Thailand. It is described from just one single specimen collected at around 775 m depth.

== Description ==
This benthic species is distinguishable from its congeners from several characteristics, including short snout, massive head, relatively large eyes, horizontally oval, slender long body trunk 40% body length, slightly convex-shaped posterior margin of the pectoral fins, and dark brown-colored body with no stripes or spots. The only specimen ever caught is a non-adult male which has a maximum total length of 50.8 cm.

== Distribution & habitat ==
Although caught at 772-775 m depth in the Andaman Sea, there are still no details of its exact habitat's range or depth.
