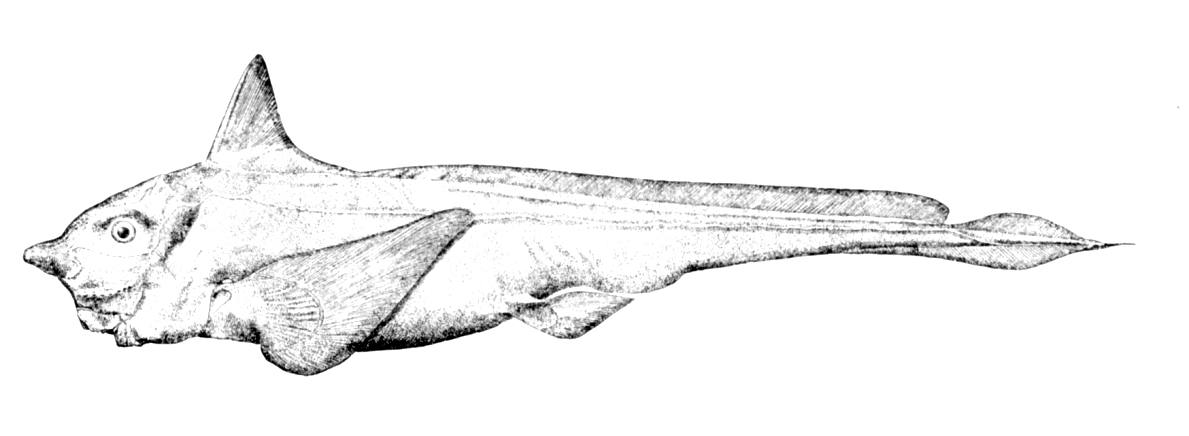
- Illustration of H. affinis

Conservation status
- Least Concern (IUCN 3.1)

Scientific classification
- Kingdom: Animalia
- Phylum: Chordata
- Class: Chondrichthyes
- Subclass: Holocephali
- Order: Chimaeriformes
- Family: Chimaeridae
- Genus: Hydrolagus
- Species: H. affinis

Binomial name
- Hydrolagus affinis (Brito Capello, 1868)

= Small-eyed rabbitfish =

Species of fish

The small-eyed rabbitfish (Hydrolagus affinis) is a marine, demersal, cartilaginous fish of the family Chimaeridae. This fish inhabits deep waters of the Northern Atlantic ocean, making it relatively cryptic and rarely encountered by humans. The species name affinis, meaning “related” in latin, refers to this fish’s morphological similarities to other fishes in its family including Hydrolagus pallidus.

== Physical description ==
The small-eyed rabbitfish has a laterally compressed, elongate body with a relatively large head and a short, blunt, conical snout characteristic of the Chimaridae family. It is scaleless, and the body is deepest just behind the operculum and tapers into a skinny, whip-like caudal. This species reaches lengths of 147 cm (total length, from the snout to the tip of the caudal fin) and can weigh up to 8 kg. Coloration ranges from brown to dark purple on the dorsal aspect with a lighter white ventral aspect. It has relatively prominent, green, ellipsoidal eyes, large nostrils, and a sub-terminal mouth set below the conical snout. In size, its eyes are normally more than 20% of its overall head length. The large anterior nostrils are used for breathing instead of the mouth. In the mouth are six hypermineralized tooth plates split into 3 pairs. The bottom jaw has a single pair and the upper jaw has the remaining two pairs. The tooth plates and head shape are “rabbit-like” inspiring the common name “rabbitfish”. The tooth plates are one of the only non-cartilaginous aspects of this fish and therefore play an important role in the fossil record and study of evolutionary history of the Holocephalans and all of the Chondrichthyans. The lateral line morphology is very prominent in these fish and extends onto the head. The lateral line is a sensory system found in fishes that provides information about a fish’s environment via vibrations in the water. The Chimaeridae family has distinct enlarged dilations of the lateral line canals on the snout, between series of C-shaped cartilaginous rings. The pattern of lateral lines on the head, particularly those below the eyes, are useful as a tool for distinguishing between species. Adjacent to the lateral lines on the snout are the Ampullae of Lorenzini, a network of pores used for electroreception, which are a morphological characteristic and sensory trait that define the class Chondrichthyes.

Hydrolagus affinis has five types of fins. Most prominent are the paired, broad, triangular, “wing-like” pectoral fins, which are the main force of propulsion via a flapping motion. The paired pelvic fins are much smaller and slightly squared, used for balancing the fish as it swims The first dorsal fin is tall and preceded by a calcified, venomous spine. The first dorsal fin also serves to stabilize the fish as it moves. The anterior aspect of the dorsal spine has two rows of serration that become gradually dulled with age. The second dorsal fin is short and long originating near the middle of the body and continuing to the caudal. The caudal is diphycercal, meaning it is internally and externally symmetrical and the vertebral column extends to the tip of the tail. The caudal fin is lanceolate, meaning that it is “leaf-shaped” and tapers to a point, with an extending filament. The anal fin is reduced and fused to the ventral lobe of the caudal fin. The fused anal fin is a key characteristic in differentiating species in the genus Hydrolagus from those in the genus Chimaeridae, which have a notch separating the anal and caudal fin. Hydrolagus affinis exhibits distinct sexual dimorphism. Males of this species possess a frontal (or cephalic) tenaculum, paired pre-pelvic tenaculae, and paired pelvic claspers. The frontal tenaculum, a structure unique to chimeroid fishes, is a small club-like protrusion with a bulbous tip armed with sharp denticles (sharp, tooth-like structures) located on top of the head anterior to the eyes. This structure varies between species and may have relevance to species distinction. The paired pre-pelvic tenaculae are in the shape of flat blades and are housed in pouches on the ventral side. Each has a row of denticles and articulates with the anterior edge of the pelvic girdle, the internal cartilaginous skeletal structure to which the pelvic fins are anchored. Claspers are a structure present in all males in the class Chondrichthyes. H. affinis has bifid pelvic claspers extending from the medial edge of the pelvic fin. All of these structures play a role in copulation. Females of H. affinis, and other deep-sea Chondrichthyans, are known to be larger than their male counterparts. This is theorized to be a mechanism for both having larger young and therefore increasing their survival rate and to maintain maternal health after birthing offspring to support fitness in a resource-poor, deep-sea environment. The family Chimaeridae, the “shortnose chimeras” or “ratfishes”, is the most speciose of the Holocephalans containing 22 species split into two genera (Hydrolagus and Chimaera). Many of these species have very similar morphological characteristics making species distinction particularly difficult. Hydrolagus affinis is most commonly confused with the pale chimera (Hydrolagus pallidus) and they are predominantly differentiated by color with H. affinis being much darker than H. pallidus.

Not many observations of juvenile specimens of Hydrolagus affinis have been recorded. Juveniles will be lighter in color and have sharper serration on the posterior aspect of the dorsal fin spine. Juvenile males will not have developed a frontal tenaculum but will have visible pre-pelvic tenaculae and pelvic claspers.

== Distribution ==
Hydrolagus affinis inhabits the Northern Atlantic Ocean between depths of 300m to 3,000m predominantly inhabiting continental slopes down to deep sea plains. This species is most common at relatively deep depths, usually increasing in catch frequency at depths greater than 1000m. These fish are also found on raised topographical features like the Mid-Atlantic Ridge and seamounts.) H. affinis is known to utilize hydrothermal vent environments like the Lucky Strike site on the Mid-Atlantic Ridge, in order to forage at these ecological hotspots. It occurs over seabeds of mud or soft substrate, and is found in water temperatures between 3.6–5.9 °C (38.5–42.6 °F). Little is known about the abundance or population distribution of this species due to its cryptic nature and a lack of specific scientific inquiries into its distribution, behavior, and life history.

== General life history ==
Like many deep-sea species, the small-eyed rabbitfish is slow moving, slow growing, and long-lived. Additionally, this species matures at a relatively old age, has low fecundity, and long gestation periods. These are characteristic adaptations for species that live in an environment with low temperature, high pressure, and scarce food and oxygen. This resource poor environment makes it advantageous for species like H. affinis to have reduced metabolic activity, following the “visual interactions hypothesis” which states that declining light at increased depths decreases the selection pressure for high locomotory ability for species that hunt visually like this chimaera. This fish primarily uses its large, “wing-like” pectoral fins for locomotion, making it incapable of extended fast movement, giving further merit to this hypothesis. H. affinis is known to predate invertebrates like crustaceans and mollusks as well as other deep-sea fishes. This fish uses its paired bony teeth plates and sub-terminal jaw to scrape invertebrates from the substrate and crush their shells.

As a member of the cartilaginous Chondrichthyans, H. affinis has relatively few hard-structures to be used in studies of age, growth-rate, and life history compared to bony fishes. Studies have investigated the efficacy of eye-lenses, vertebral radii, spine sections, tooth plates, and body-length frequencies but none of these natural tools have proven accurate. The most reliable structure appears to be the annual banding pattern in the cross-section of the dorsal fin spine. Studies of other Holocephalans have also demonstrated that growth rates vary across populations of the same species and are likely correlated with depth which is highly variable among species in the Chimaeridae family. Additionally, due to the slow growth rate and reproduction of this species it is integral that these natural tools for aging and growth studies can be collected nonlethally and without impacting survival or growth of the individual.

Rabbitfish were recently caught off of the coast of Greenland and were taken to do research on the various parasites in and on the fish. Nine parasites were recorded for the H. affinis species. The nine parasites included Trichodina, Chimaericolidea, Calicotyle, Multicalyx, Chimaerohemecus, Gonocerca phycidis, Gyrocotyle abyssicola, Gyrocotyle major, and Lernaeopodina longibrachia. They were found in the urinary system, gills, cloaca, gallbladder and bile ducts, heart, stomach and oesophagus, intestines, and eyes.

== Reproduction ==
Hydrolagus affinis is an oviparous species, meaning that after internal fertilization, one egg develops in each ovary and is laid on the substrate to continue development before hatching. This means that a reproductively active female can develop at most two offspring in a given reproductive bout. Egg case morphology is likely species dependent and females of this species lay an egg capsule that is brown, horny, and tadpole-shaped. H. affinis can be described as a “punctuated breeder” meaning that females are pregnant for at least a year and take several years off between reproductive bouts. This slow reproductive cycle is an adaptation to the low energy deep-sea environment. Due to low resource availability, individuals make a trade-off between high litter size and individual offspring investment. As a result, young of this species are larger and have a higher survival rate than pelagic Chondrichthyans but are more vulnerable to novel pressures and changing environments. During copulation, males of this species will use their frontal tenaculum and pre-pelvic tenaculae to hold their partner while delivering sperm using their pelvic claspers. Other species of chimaeras are known to make seasonal migrations to shallower waters for courtship and reproduction but whether this behavior exists and the seasonality and rate of reproduction are unconfirmed in H. affinis.

== Communal behavior ==
Like many other Chondrichthyans, chimaeras are known to aggregate into groups based on shared developmental stage (juvenile, subadult, or adult) and within adult maturity groups segregate by sex at different depths. Males tend to inhabit shallower water relative to conspecific females. This is theorized to be a strategy to avoid the aggression of one sex towards another that is often associated with mating activity in other Chondrichthyans. It has been suggested that groups of females will migrate into shallower waters, overlapping with the preferential depths of conspecific males for reproduction and to enjoy increased temperatures and prey availability before moving back into greater depths for embryo development. Apparent evidence of this aggregative behavior in H. affinis was observed by Jakobsdóttir et al. when analyzing bottom-trawl survey data from Icelandic waters.

== Conservation status ==
Hydrolagus affinis is currently listed as a species of “Least Concern” by the International Union for Conservation of Nature (IUCN) Red List. There is no commercial fishery for this species and when it is not the focus of scientific research, it is most commonly caught as bycatch by deep-sea trawling and longline fisheries. There are records of species in the Chimaeridae family being used commercially for fish meal and to extract high-quality machine oil from the liver. With little direct research into the population dynamics of this species it is difficult to detect changes and accurately understand population fluctuation to determine whether populations are stable or declining. Due to their low growth rate, low fecundity, and higher age at reproductive maturity, H. affinis is especially vulnerable to novel threats and has low capacity to recover from population decline. Garcia et al. found that the average fishing-related mortality to drive deep-water Chondrichthyans like H. affinis to extinction is just 38-58% of that required for oceanic and continental shelf species respectively. With the rapid expansion of deep-sea fisheries, it is of the utmost importance to establish protocols for monitoring the population status of deep-sea species like the small-eyed rabbitfish to prevent irreversible damage. Additionally, the perennially cold waters inhabited by H. affinis make it especially vulnerable to the increasingly variable changes in global climate.
