= Chimaera bahamaensis =

Conservation status
- Least Concern (IUCN 3.1)

Scientific classification
- Kingdom: Animalia
- Phylum: Chordata
- Class: Chondrichthyes
- Subclass: Holocephali
- Order: Chimaeriformes
- Family: Chimaeridae
- Genus: Chimaera
- Species: C. bahamaensis

Binomial name
- Chimaera bahamaensis Kemper, Ebert, Didier & Compagno, 2010

Species of fish

Chimaera bahamaensis, commonly known as the Bahamas ghost shark, is a species of fish in the family Chimaeridae. It is found in North Atlantic Ocean around the Bahamas, specifically it has been found east of Andros Island. Chimaera bahamaensis is known to inhabit marine waters from a depth range of 1,483 metres (4,865 ft) – 1,506 metres (4,941 ft). It is one of the most recently described members of the genus Chimaera and to date only three specimen have been found.

The Chimaera bahamaensis displays a combination of morphometric features which include a short pectoral-pelvic space with a long pelvic-caudal space, a long pre-narial length, and a relatively large body that is uniformly caramel brown with dark brown fins.
