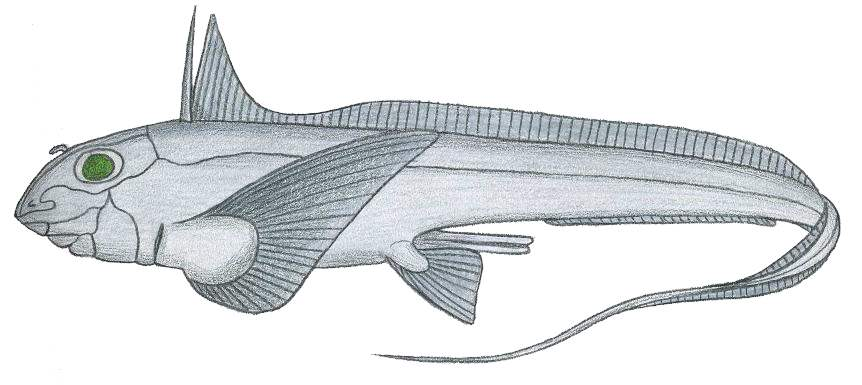
- Chimaera cubana

Scientific classification
- Kingdom: Animalia
- Phylum: Chordata
- Class: Chondrichthyes
- Subclass: Holocephali
- Order: Chimaeriformes
- Family: Chimaeridae
- Genus: Chimaera; Linnaeus, 1758

Type species
- Chimaera monstrosa Linnaeus, 1758

Species
- 16, see text

= Chimaera (genus) =

Chimaera Temporal range: Eocene–Recent

Genus of cartilaginous fishes

Chimaera is the type genus of the cartilaginous fish family Chimaeridae.

== Species ==
There are currently 16 recognized species in this genus:

- Chimaera argiloba Last, W. T. White & Pogonoski, 2008 (Whitefin chimaera)
- Chimaera bahamaensis Kemper, Ebert, Didier & Compagno, 2010 (Bahamas ghost shark)
- Chimaera buccaginella Clerkin, Elbert, & Kemper, 2017 (Dark-mouth chimaera)
- Chimaera carophila Kemper, Ebert, Naylor & Didier, 2014 (Brown chimaera)
- Chimaera compacta Iglésias, Kemper & Naylor, 2022 (Stubby chimaera)
- Chimaera cubana Howell-Rivero, 1936 (Cuban chimaera)
- Chimaera didierae Clerkin, Elbert, & Kemper, 2017 (Falkor chimaera)
- Chimaera fulva Didier, Last & W. T. White, 2008 (Southern chimaera)
- Chimaera jordani S. Tanaka (I), 1905 (Jordan's chimaera)
- Chimaera lignaria Didier, 2002 (Carpenter's chimaera)
- Chimaera macrospina Didier, Last & W. T. White, 2008 (Longspine chimaera)
- Chimaera monstrosa Linnaeus, 1758 (Rabbit fish)
- Chimaera notafricana Kemper, Ebert, Compagno & Didier, 2010 (Cape chimaera)
- Chimaera obscura Didier, Last & W. T. White, 2008 (Shortspine chimaera)
- Chimaera ogilbyi Waite, 1898 (Ogilby's ghostshark)
- Chimaera opalescens Luchetti, Iglésias & Sellos, 2011 (Opal chimaera)
- Chimaera orientalis Angulo, M. I. Bussing, W. A. Bussing & Murase, 2014 (Eastern Pacific black chimaera)
- Chimaera owstoni S. Tanaka (I), 1905 (Owston's chimaera)
- Chimaera panthera Didier, 1998 (Leopard chimaera)
- Chimaera phantasma D. S. Jordan & Snyder, 1900 (Silver chimaera)
- Chimaera stellata Teramura, Senou & Hirase, 2024 (Stellated chimaera)
- Chimaera supapae Ebert, Krajangdara, Fahmi, & Kemper, 2024 (Andaman shortnose chimaera)
- Chimaera willwatchi Clerkin, Elbert, & Kemper, 2017 (Seafarer ghostshark)

== Fossil species ==
Several fossil species are attributed to Chimaera, but only two are confidently assignable to it. These two are C. seymourensis from the Late-Eocene La Meseta Formation on Seymour Island off the coast of the Antarctic Peninsula, and C. pliocenica from the Pliocene of Tuscany, Italy. Chimaera zangerli from the Late Cretaceous (Maastrichtian) of Seymour Island was considered by later authors to belong to Elasmodectes instead. C. eophantasma from the Paleocene of England has since been considered a synonym of Elasmodus hunteri. C. gosseleti and C. rupeliensis from the Oligocene of Belgium are synonymous with each other, with C. gosseleti being the senior synonym, and have subsequently been placed in the genus Harriotta. Chimaera javana from the Miocene of Java is lost, and therefore considered a nomen dubium. "Chimaera" anomala from the Miocene of Australia is more similar to Ischyodus, and does not belong to Chimeridae.
