= Hydrolagus erithacus =

Robin's ghostshark

Conservation status
- Data Deficient (IUCN 3.1)

Scientific classification
- Kingdom: Animalia
- Phylum: Chordata
- Class: Chondrichthyes
- Subclass: Holocephali
- Order: Chimaeriformes
- Family: Chimaeridae
- Genus: Hydrolagus
- Species: H. erithacus

Binomial name
- Hydrolagus erithacus Walovich 2017

Species of fish

Hydrolagus erithacus, or Robin's ghostshark, is a species of fish in the family Chimaeridae. It is found in the southeastern Atlantic and southwestern Indian oceans.

There exists a rapid development of fisheries since the 1970s in their territory, targeting deepwater sharks. While there is no data available for ghost sharks in this region, the South African Prince Edward Islands Marine Protected Areas may provide refuge to this species.
