= Leopard chimaera =

Conservation status
- Least Concern (IUCN 3.1)

Scientific classification
- Kingdom: Animalia
- Phylum: Chordata
- Class: Chondrichthyes
- Subclass: Holocephali
- Order: Chimaeriformes
- Family: Chimaeridae
- Genus: Chimaera
- Species: C. panthera

Binomial name
- Chimaera panthera (Didier, 1998)

Species of fish

The leopard chimaera (Chimaera panthera) is a species of fish in the family Chimaeridae endemic to New Zealand. Its natural habitat is open seas. This species is considered rare and any specimens obtained should be sent to the New Zealand National Fish Collection at the Museum of New Zealand Te Papa Tongarewa.

== Morphology and biology ==
This species is distinguished from all other members of the genus by gray coloration with chocolate brown reticulations and spots covering the body and fins, as well as additional external features such as rounded pelvic fins, first dorsal fin with distinct white margin, preopercular and oral lateral line canals sharing a common branch, and morphology of pelvic claspers in males bifid, the distal 1/3 divided, with pale colored fleshy, distal lobes.

== Distribution and habitat ==
It is known from very few specimens from three localised areas at depths of 327 to 1,020 m. It has been found in deep waters around northern New Zealand.

== Conservation status ==
The New Zealand Department of Conservation has classified the leopard chimaera as "Not Threatened" with the qualifier "Data Poor" under the New Zealand Threat Classification System.
