= Hydrolagus melanophasma =

Conservation status
- Least Concern (IUCN 3.1)

Scientific classification
- Kingdom: Animalia
- Phylum: Chordata
- Class: Chondrichthyes
- Subclass: Holocephali
- Order: Chimaeriformes
- Family: Chimaeridae
- Genus: Hydrolagus
- Species: H. melanophasma

Binomial name
- Hydrolagus melanophasma (K.C. James, D.A. Ebert, D.J. Long and D.A. Didier, 2009)

Species of fish

The Eastern Pacific black ghostshark (Hydrolagus melanophasma, literally a combination of "water rabbit" and "black ghost") is a species of fish in the family Chimaeridae. Despite its name, it does not belong to the clade Selachii used for the modern classification of sharks. It is, however, distantly related to the sharks in the sense that both are Chondrichthyes (cartilaginous fishes).

This species is not known to be used by humans, and is also understudied along with many other Chimaeras. They are a marine species, known for being benthic (at the bottom of the body of water) and can also be in marine neritic (shallow ocean) habitats.

== Description ==
The Eastern Pacific Black Ghostshark (Hydrolagus melanophasma) has an all over dark-black coloration along with large eyes. Around the midpoint between the eyes and the end of the snout there is a more lightly colored band. When preserved, the coloration appears somewhere around a dark purple or brown and the claspers gain a lighter color.

To differentiate them from other chimaeras, they are attributed to having a large triangular dorsal fin spine which is slightly curved along with a second long dorsal fin which has an even height from start to end. These fins do not have a notable distance between each other. Its pectoral fins are very large and are able to reach past the pelvic fin insertion. This species also does not have an anal fin.

Males at maturity possess trifid claspers, meaning their reproductive organ has three parts. About a quarter of the posterior end of these claspers are branching. The males have a frontal tenaculum on their head and prepelvic tenacula. Those without these features are determined to be immature. The tenacula are used to grip onto a female while mating. On the tenacula and claspers there are denticles present. Denticles are the tooth-like scales found on the skin of sharks and rays.

Mature females had oocytes that were at least 10 mm in diameter. If they were less than that, they were deemed immature. Oocytes are the female germ cells, also known as their developing eggs.

The lateral lines on the head appear to be open channels and are wider around the snout area. The lateral line of the fish's trunk goes straight across the body without much patterning or movement.

== Systematics and taxonomy ==
This species falls under the order Chimaeriformes from the class Chondrichthyes and subclass Holocephali. This means that they have skeletons made of cartilage. The Chimaeriformes have two genera, the Chimaera and the Hydrolagus. In the Chimaera there are 11 species identified and in Hydrolagus there are 22. This species is of the genus Hydrolagus because Chimaera have anal fins while Hydrolagus lack an anal fin.

Aside from specific morphological characteristics, the distributions of the Hydrolagus help differentiate between each species. This species was identified as Hydrolagus melanophasma because it was found in the waters near Southern and Baja California. In general, it can be found in the northern part of the Eastern Pacific.

== Distribution ==
The Eastern Pacific Black Ghostshark can typically be found around the pacific coast of Southern and Baja California Peninsula. It has also been spotted by Laguna Nuxco and Cabo San Lucas of Mexico and by Santa Rosa Island of Ecuador. They were found a couple of times near Valdivia and the south of Chile.

This species seems to be distributed throughout the Eastern Pacific from approximately 23 degrees North to 40 degrees South.

So far they have only been found in deeper waters; somewhere between depths of 565 to 1800 meters. Given that not much research is done on chimaeras, the distribution of H. melanophasma could be wider than what it is currently believed to be.

== Life history ==
Those in the order Chimaeriformes are known to be oviparous, meaning that the females lay the eggs, then the young hatch from the eggs later on.

From a deep-sea camera video from the tropical eastern Pacific (2016), there was a female H. melanophasma spotted with egg cases. The female's egg cases were paired and had yellow coloring. They were attached to her and had an oblong or "spindle" shape. They had little projections at the back end which are likely used to grip onto a surface when the eggs are laid. The ability of how many offspring females can produce is unknown for this species, as for many other Chimaeras.

Females of the species H. melanophasma have a cloaca, where they have uterine and anal openings. Many Holocephali tend to lack the cloaca, but this species along with the elephant fish (Callorhynchus milli) and the cockfish (Callorhynchus callorhynchus) possess one.

For those of the holocephalan subclass, many have their seminal vesicle divided into two sections. This includes the Eastern Pacific Black Ghostshark (Hydrolagus melanophasma) and the Spotted Ratfish (Hydrolagus colliei).

== Behavior ==
Though this species has not been observed often, it has typically been spotted either alone or in pairs. This would suggest that this species was not very social, but in the video mentioned earlier there were 5 spotted in a group. There were 4 males and 1 female in this aggregation. More studies would be helpful to determine what kind of social behavior this species possesses.

They tend to swim just a few meters above the sea floor, but were not seen resting on said floor. The floor that they swim above seems to often be soft-bottom or patches of cobble, while other species such as H. alphus would be in areas with high rocky relief.

They seem very quick to flee; anytime a remotely operated vehicle approached they would immediately swim off out of view. Other Chimaera species, like the Harriotta raleighana, would not really care about the vehicle, and others might even go up to it. Although, in the case where a group of 5 were spotted, they went up to the camera recording it to collect bait that was attached to it.

== Conservation status ==
This species was determined by the IUCN to be of least concern in terms of conservation status, thus there are not any conservation efforts being done for this species. Although, more research is definitely necessary. There's a lack of knowledge related to their population numbers and chimaeras are understudied in general.

Given that the species resides in deep waters that are typically outside of fishing areas, it seems that their population should be fine. Although, it has been caught as bycatch by multiple different fisheries, which could be a possible raise of concern. They were caught as bycatch when fisheries were going for fish like the South Pacific Hake (Merluccius gayi) or the Patagonian toothfish (Dissostichus eleginoides) near Chile. Some demersal (living near the sea floor) crustacean fisheries also caught them as bycatch. The records do not provide much information because when they are caught as bycatch it is likely not kept or reported since they are not commercial fish. Also, Chimaeras are usually put under the fishing code "Hydrolagus spp." so its difficult to determine which exact species was caught.
