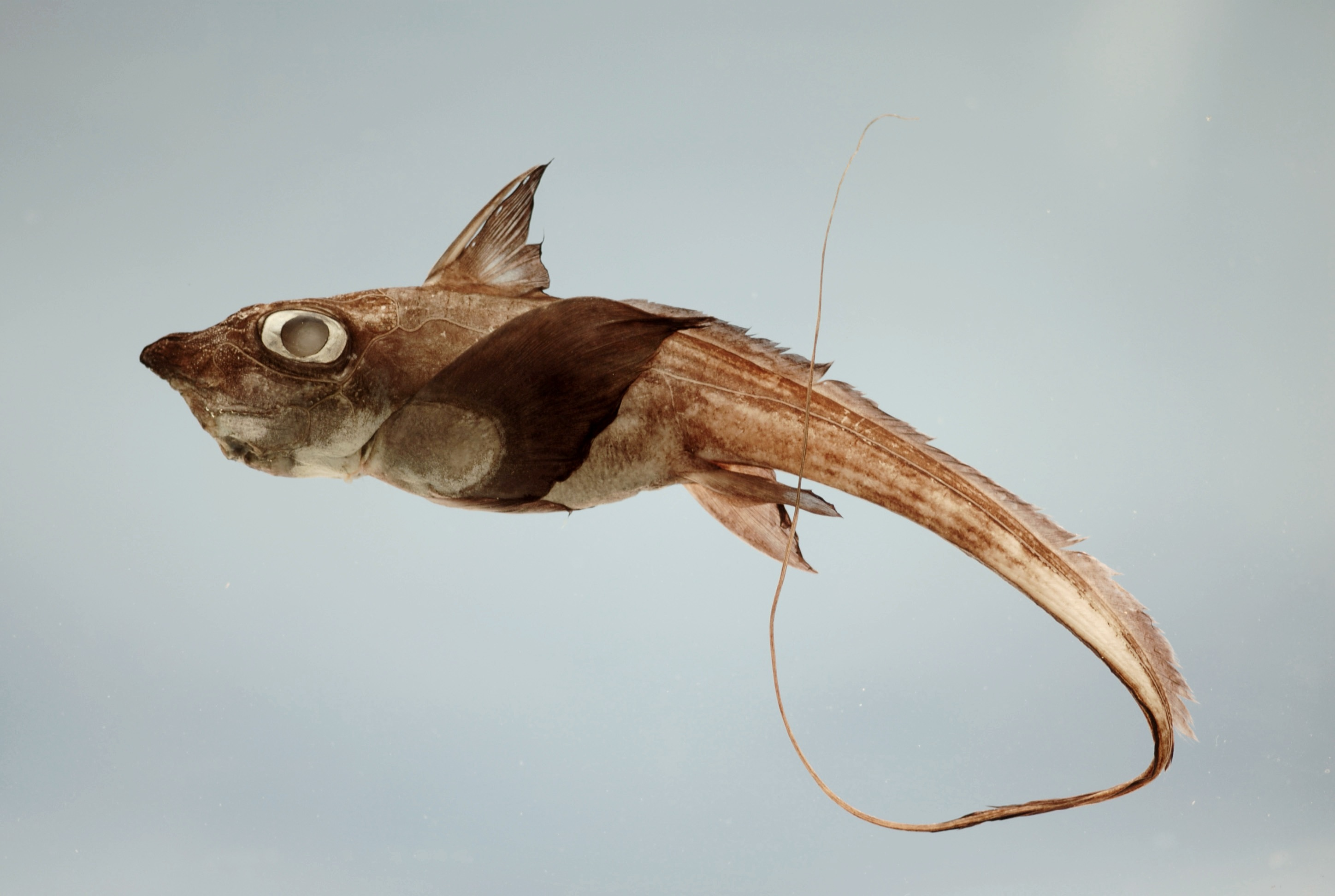

Conservation status
- Least Concern (IUCN 3.1)

Scientific classification
- Kingdom: Animalia
- Phylum: Chordata
- Class: Chondrichthyes
- Subclass: Holocephali
- Order: Chimaeriformes
- Family: Chimaeridae
- Genus: Hydrolagus
- Species: H. alberti

Binomial name
- Hydrolagus alberti Bigelow & Schroeder, 1951

= Gulf chimaera =

Species of cartilaginous fish

The gulf chimaera (Hydrolagus alberti) is a species of cartilaginous fish in the family Chimaeridae found near Mexico, the United States, and possibly Suriname. Its natural habitat is open seas.
