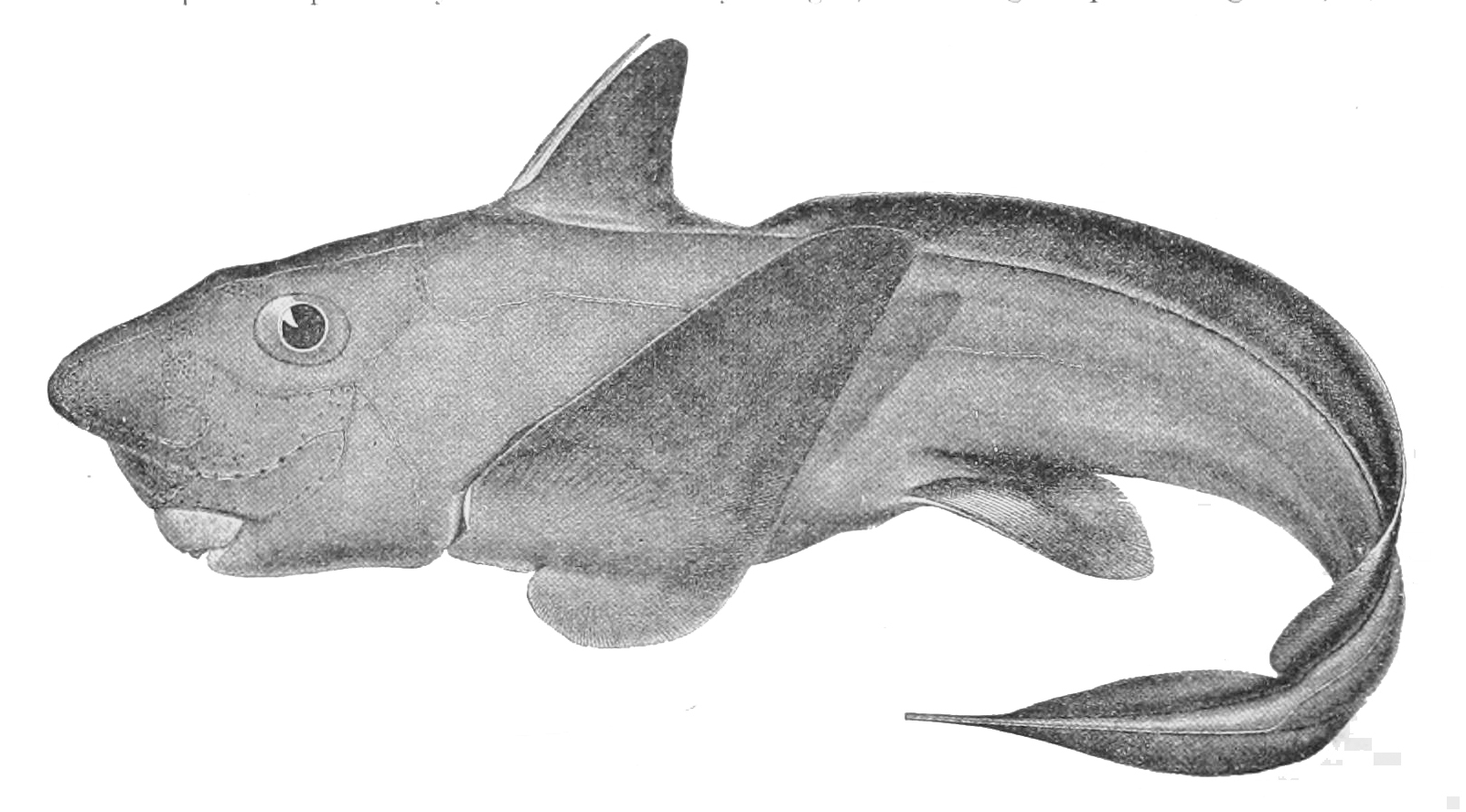

Conservation status
- Least Concern (IUCN 3.1)

Scientific classification
- Kingdom: Animalia
- Phylum: Chordata
- Class: Chondrichthyes
- Subclass: Holocephali
- Order: Chimaeriformes
- Family: Chimaeridae
- Genus: Hydrolagus
- Species: H. purpurescens

Binomial name
- Hydrolagus purpurescens (C. H. Gilbert, 1905)

= Purple chimaera =

Species of fish

The purple chimaera or purple ghostshark (Hydrolagus purpurescens) is a species of fish in the family Chimaeridae found off Japan and Hawaii. Its natural habitat is open seas.
