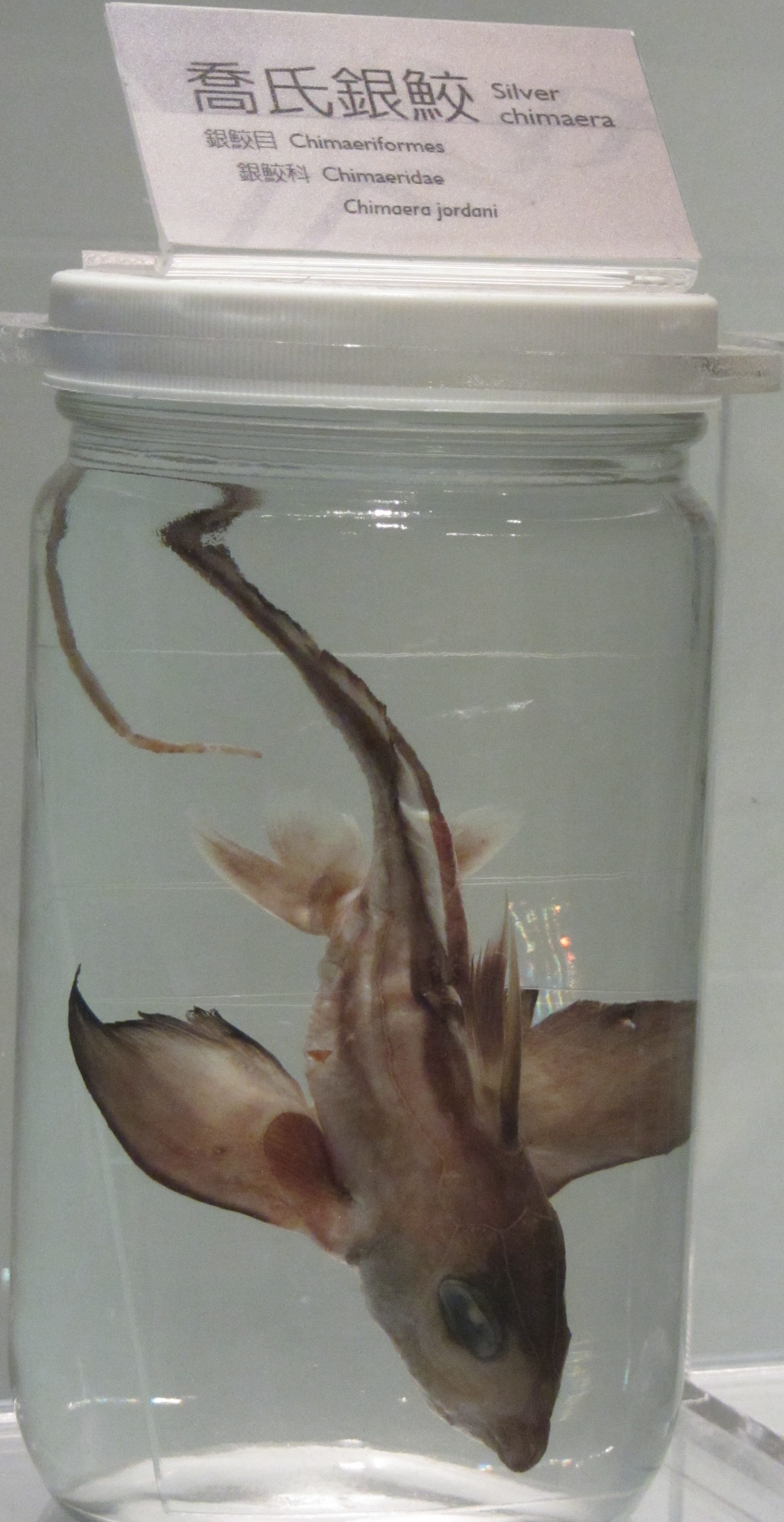

Conservation status
- Data Deficient (IUCN 3.1)

Scientific classification
- Kingdom: Animalia
- Phylum: Chordata
- Class: Chondrichthyes
- Subclass: Holocephali
- Order: Chimaeriformes
- Family: Chimaeridae
- Genus: Chimaera
- Species: C. jordani

Binomial name
- Chimaera jordani S. Tanaka (I), 1905

= Jordan's chimaera =

Species of fish

Jordan's chimaera (Chimaera jordani) is a species of fish in the family Chimaeridae found near Japan, Madagascar, and Mozambique. It is named for the American ichthyologist David Starr Jordan (1851–1931). Its natural habitat is open seas.
