= Carpenter's chimaera =

Conservation status
- Least Concern (IUCN 3.1)

Scientific classification
- Kingdom: Animalia
- Phylum: Chordata
- Class: Chondrichthyes
- Subclass: Holocephali
- Order: Chimaeriformes
- Family: Chimaeridae
- Genus: Chimaera
- Species: C. lignaria

Binomial name
- Chimaera lignaria Didier, 2002

Species of fish

The carpenter's chimaera (Chimaera lignaria), also known as the giant chimaera or the giant purple chimaera, is a species of fish in the family Chimaeridae.

== Description ==
The carpenter's chimaera grows to 128 centimetres (50 in) in length; the largest specimen recorded, a male, had a total length of 142 centimetres (56 in), although some specimens may grow up to roughly 150 centimetres (59 in). It has been described as a "distinctly large and robust chimaera" and is purple in color, with a very large head. The claspers of males are colored purple at their intersection with the species' body while their tips are white. 1/3 of the area at the end of claspers is divided.

== Biology and habitat ==
The carpenter's chimaera exhibits oviparity, with egg shells containing "horns" on them. Males mature at a body length (BDL) of roughly 60 centimetres (24 in), while females mature at 70 centimetres (28 in) BDL, generally equaling a total length of roughly 100 centimetres (39 in). Little is known about the species' biology.

The chimaera is a marine species, typically found on slanted and flat areas of deep oceans at the continental slope, sometimes extending into the bathyal zone. It has a broad depth range, occurring in waters 400 metres (1,300 ft) – 1,800 metres (5,900 ft) in depth, typically in the deeper part of this range. It is a benthic fish, meaning that it is denser than water and lives at the bottom of the sea floor.

== Distribution and conservation ==
The carpenter's chimaera is found in the southwest Pacific Ocean and the eastern Indian Ocean, particularly in Tasmania, Australia and New Zealand. Its exact population is unknown; however, a large number of specimens have been found in deep waters from fishing and scientific research. Due to this, it is thought that the species is common in the parts of oceans it lives in.

The species is threatened by trawls, which, when searching for other species that live in deep waters in the same area as the carpenter's chimaera, will sometimes catch this species incidentally. Aside from this, there are no major threats; the species is not targeted for commercial purposes. Studies have shown that the amount of the species caught as a bycatch by trawls in New Zealand has increased from 1990 – 2011; however, in Australia, it is currently caught infrequently, partially due to the Australian South Tasman Rise Trawl Fishery's shutting down in 2007. It also has some protection against fisheries due to the depths of the waters it lives in. No conservation actions are taking place for the species currently, although part of its range extends into protected areas. In June 2018 the New Zealand Department of Conservation classified the carpenter's chimaera as "Not Threatened" under the New Zealand Threat Classification System. The International Union for Conservation of Nature lists it as Least Concern, as of 18 February 2015.
