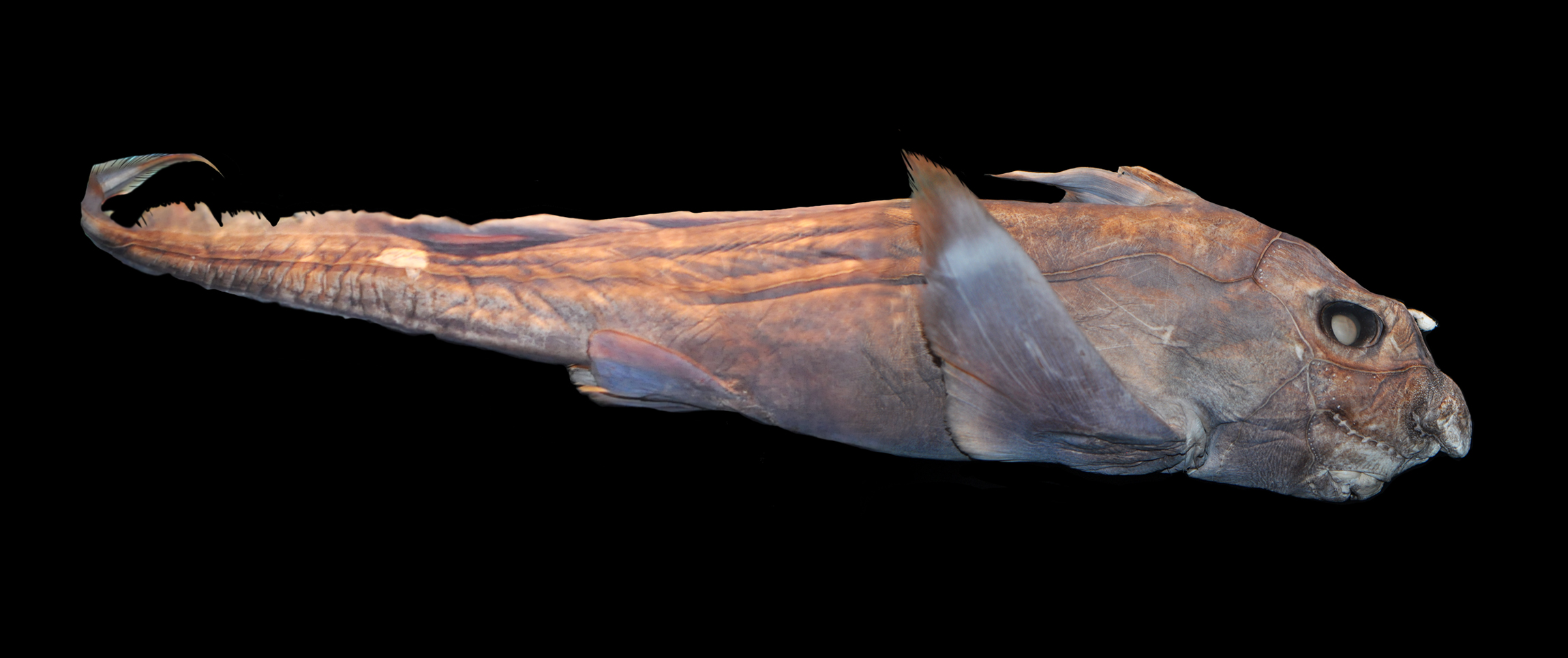

Conservation status
- Least Concern (IUCN 3.1)

Scientific classification
- Kingdom: Animalia
- Phylum: Chordata
- Class: Chondrichthyes
- Subclass: Holocephali
- Order: Chimaeriformes
- Family: Chimaeridae
- Genus: Hydrolagus
- Species: H. trolli

Binomial name
- Hydrolagus trolli Didier & Séret, 2002

= Pointy-nosed blue chimaera =

Species of cartilaginous fish

The pointy-nosed blue chimaera (Hydrolagus trolli), also known as the pointy-nosed blue ratfish, Ray Troll's chimaera or abyssal ghostshark, is a species of deep-sea fish in the family Chimaeridae.

== Etymology ==
The specific name trolli honors Ray Troll, an American artist who has featured chimaeras in his art.

== Distribution and habitat ==
This species is found in the Pacific and Southern Oceans, with records from near New Caledonia, New Zealand, and southern Australia; records from South Africa refer to other species. It is a deep-water species that has been recorded on deep continental and insular slopes at depths between 610 and 2,000 metres (2,000 and 6,560 ft), but more commonly below 1,000 metres (3,300 ft).

Specimens provisionally assigned to this species have also been seen in waters near California and Hawaii, alive, in 2009. As with many other deep-sea species, its distribution likely covers much of the globe, but is poorly known. However, this species of Chimaeridae was the first to have been captured on film, leading to further insight on it.

== Description ==
The body has distinctive blue-gray coloration. A dark line is seen around the orbit, as well as dark shadowing along edges of lateral line canals. The snout is pointed. It grows to 120 cm (47 in) total length. It also has a venomous spine in front of its dorsal fin, which is used in defense.

Females mature around 55 cm (22 in) in body length and males at 60–65 cm (24–26 in). The species is oviparous.

== Fisheries ==
The species has no commercial value, but it occurs as bycatch in fisheries with deep-water benthic trawls. It might also be bycatch in (illegal) Patagonian toothfish fisheries. However, most of the habitat of this species is deeper than where deep-water fisheries typically operate.

== Conservation status ==
In June 2018 the New Zealand Department of Conservation classified the pointy-nosed blue chimaera as "Not Threatened" with the qualifier "Secure Overseas" under the New Zealand Threat Classification System.
