= Longspine chimaera =

Conservation status
- Least Concern (IUCN 3.1)

Scientific classification
- Kingdom: Animalia
- Phylum: Chordata
- Class: Chondrichthyes
- Subclass: Holocephali
- Order: Chimaeriformes
- Family: Chimaeridae
- Genus: Chimaera
- Species: C. macrospina

Binomial name
- Chimaera macrospina Didier, Last & W. T. White, 2008

Species of cartilaginous fish

The longspine chimaera (Chimaera macrospina) is a chimaera species in the family Chimaeridae. It is found off of the eastern and western coasts of Australia, and lives in tropical and temperate waters 435–1,300 meters deep. Males and females grow to a maximum total length of 93.9 and 103.4 centimeters, respectively, and are brown in color.

== Description ==
The maximum length of male longspine chimaera is roughly 93.9 centimeters, and roughly 103.4 centimeters for females. It is brown in color and has deciduous skin, with males having short claspers 11–13% of their body length.

== Distribution and conservation ==
The longspine chimaera occurs exclusively in waters off the coasts of Australia. It lives on the west coast in the eastern part of the Indian Ocean and on the east coast in the western Pacific Ocean, and is native to New South Wales, Queensland, and Western Australia. However, one specimen was seen near the coast of Tasmania, south of Victoria, on 1 April 1988.

The population of the species or its relative trend is unknown, but it is not severely threatened. It is not a commercial target, but it is sometimes accidentally caught by trawls in deep waters. Most fisheries which operate in areas where the longspine chimaera lives, mostly fish in waters shallower than the typical depth range of the species. However, some fisheries, notably the Australian Commonwealth-managed Western Deepwater Trawl Fishery and the Coral Sea Fishery, catch fish in deeper waters, sometimes where the longspine chimaera occurs. This could be a potential threat to the species. There are currently no conservation actions occurring for this species, and as of February 2015, it is listed as Least Concern by IUCN.

== Behavior and habitat ==
The longspine chimaera is a marine species, living in tropical waters and warmer temperate waters. It is most commonly found from waters 800 meters deep to 1,300 meters deep, although it often lives in waters as shallow as 435 meters in depth as well. The species is oviparous, like the rest of the species in the order Chimaeriformes. Besides this, very few biological facts are known about the longspine chimaera.
