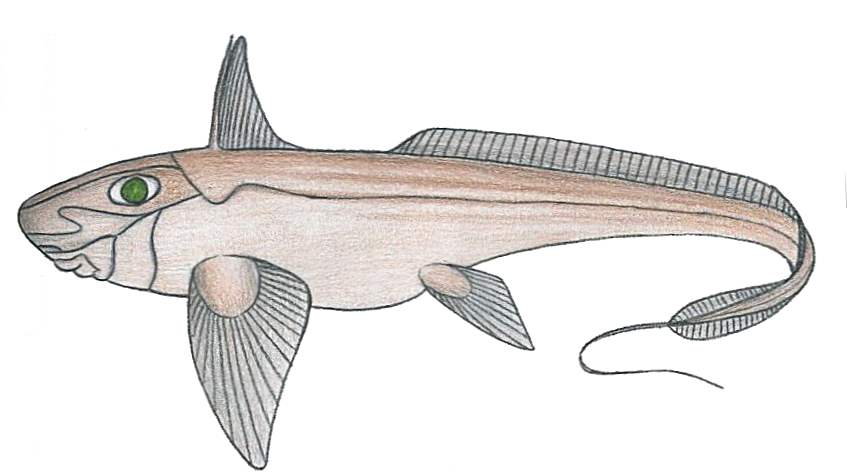

Conservation status
- Least Concern (IUCN 3.1)

Scientific classification
- Kingdom: Animalia
- Phylum: Chordata
- Class: Chondrichthyes
- Subclass: Holocephali
- Order: Chimaeriformes
- Family: Chimaeridae
- Genus: Hydrolagus
- Species: H. pallidus

Binomial name
- Hydrolagus pallidus Hardy & Stehmann, 1990

= Hydrolagus pallidus =

Species of cartilaginous fish

Hydrolagus pallidus is a marine species of fish in the family Chimaeridae found in the Northeast Atlantic Ocean, specifically near Iceland and the Canary Islands. It is commonly known as the pale chimaera or pale ghost shark, although it is not a true shark. It has been recognized as distinct from Hydrolagus affinis, its closest relative, since 1990.

== Description ==
Hydrolagus pallidus has a large body which tapers from its head to a short, blunt-tipped, tail and is pale grey or white in colour. The size reached upon maturity is 73cm in body length for males and 77cm in body length for females. In size, the eyes of H. pallidus are less than 20% of its total head length.

== Distribution and habitat ==
The natural habitat of Hydrolagus pallidus is deepwater seas and near the mid-Atlantic ridge. H. pallidus is found at a depth range of 800–3,650 metres (2,620–11,980 ft). The species has been found to occur in water temperatures of 4.4–7.0 °C (39.9–44.6 °F).

== Reproduction ==
Hydrolagus pallidus is oviparous.

== Conservation ==
H. pallidus faces a potential threat as bycatch of deepwater trawl fisheries, especially as deepwater fisheries operate at greater depths.
