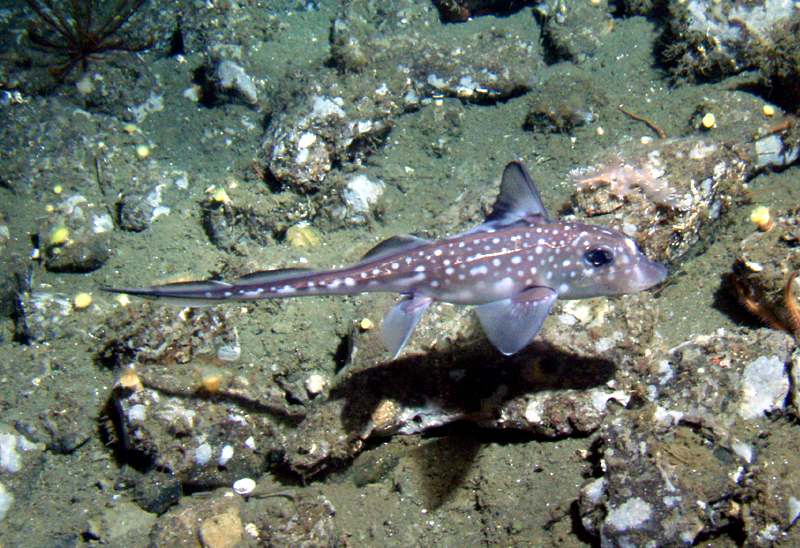

Conservation status
- Least Concern (IUCN 3.1)

Scientific classification
- Kingdom: Animalia
- Phylum: Chordata
- Class: Chondrichthyes
- Subclass: Holocephali
- Order: Chimaeriformes
- Family: Chimaeridae
- Genus: Hydrolagus
- Species: H. colliei

Binomial name
- Hydrolagus colliei Lay & E. T. Bennett, 1839

= Spotted ratfish =

Species of cartilaginous fish

The spotted ratfish (Hydrolagus colliei) is a chimaera found in the north-eastern Pacific Ocean. Often seen by divers at night in the Pacific Northwest, this cartilaginous fish gets its characteristic name from a pointed rat-like tail. The ratfish lays leathery egg cases on the bottom of muddy or sandy areas, which are often mistaken by divers as something inanimate. While mainly a deep-water species, it occurs at shallower depths in the northern part of its range. The generic name, Hydrolagus, comes from the Greek words ὕδωρ, meaning water, and λαγώς/λαγῶς, meaning hare, and the specific name honors Alexander Collie, who was a ship's surgeon and early naturalist who dissected the first specimen to be described during the voyage of HMS Blossom in the Pacific from 1825-28. The spotted ratfish is common in much of its range, not typically eaten by humans, and is not commercially caught.

== Description ==
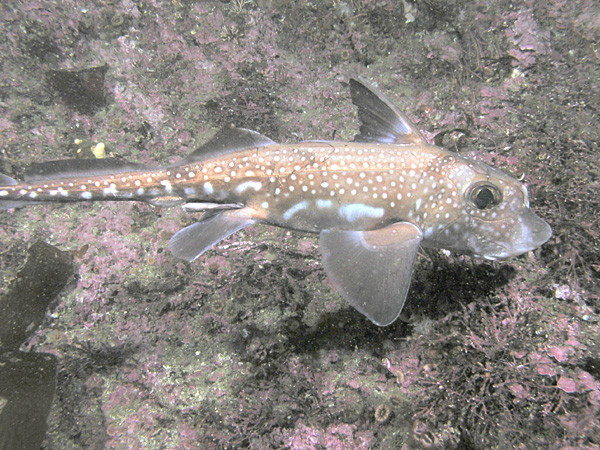

The spotted ratfish has a very distinct appearance compared to unrelated fish species. The female is up to 97 cm (38 in) long, much bigger than the male. These fish have a smooth and scaleless skin that is a silvery-bronze color, often with sparkling shades of gold, blue, and green. The speckled white spots along their backs contribute to their name. Dark edges outline both the caudal and dorsal fins, whereas the pectoral fins have a transparent outline. Their pectoral fins are large and triangular, and extend straight out from the sides of their bodies like airplane wings. They have a grooved venomous spine located at the leading edge of their dorsal fin and connected to a venom gland at its base, which is used in defense. It does not present a serious danger to humans, but can cause painful wounds and has been known to kill harbor seals that ate spotted ratfish (caused by the spine penetrating vital tissue in the stomach or esophagus after the ratfish was swallowed). The tail of the ratfish constitutes almost half of its overall length and closely resembles a pointed, rat-like tail. The body of this fish is supported by cartilage rather than bone. It has a duckbill-shaped snout and a rabbit-like face. The mouth is small and contains one pair of forward-directed, incisor-shaped teeth in the bottom jaw and two pairs in the top jaw. Unlike sharks, which have sharp teeth that are easily replaceable, spotted ratfish teeth are plate-shaped, mineralized, and permanent, which assist them in grinding their prey. Like many bony fishes, but unlike its sister group, the Elasmobranchii, the upper jaw of the chimaera is fused with the skull. Although their jaws are soft and mouths are relatively small, they have the largest biting force and jaw leverage found within the Holocephali, which supports their ability to consume large prey. One of their most mesmerizing features is their large, emerald green eyes, which are able to reflect light, similar to the eyes of a cat. H colliei have sensory canals which run laterally, and on their head they have ampullary spores which detect and respond to electric fields and are homologous to ampullae of Lorenzini.

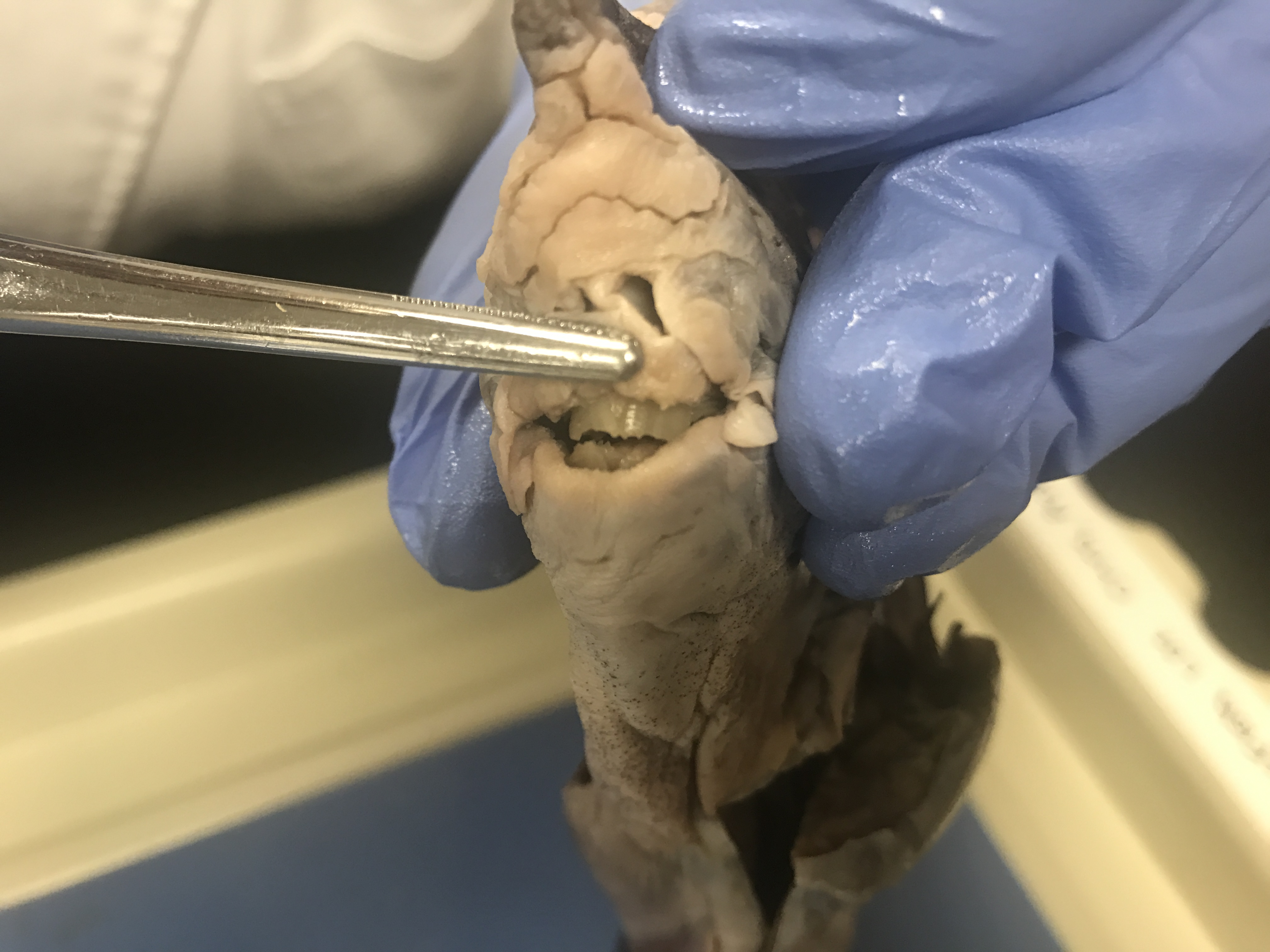
Frontal view of the plate-shaped, mineralized, and permanent teeth of H. colliei

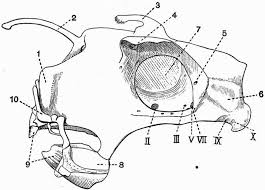
Lateral view of the generalized features of the skull: The upper jaw is fused to the cranium. Both the upper and lower teeth are plate-shaped (9). Of note, the spotted ratfish does not have a cartilaginous appendage to the frontonasal region (2), which is a common feature of the chimera.

== Distribution and habitat ==
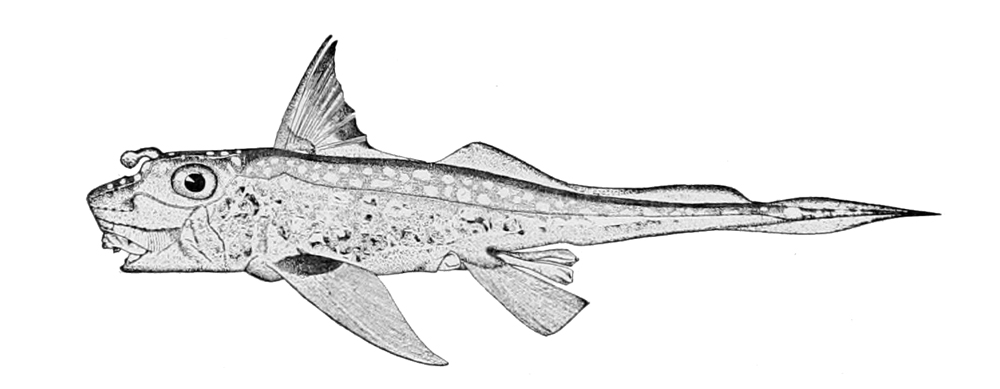

The spotted ratfish can be found in the northeastern Pacific Ocean, ranging from Alaska to Baja California, with an isolated population in the Gulf of California. They are abundant in much of their range. They be found most commonly off the Pacific Northwest. The range of depths in which this fish is found extends from 0 to 913 m (0 to 2,995 ft) below sea level, but it is most common between 50 and 400 m (160 and 1,310 ft). Spotted ratfish typically live closer to the shore in the northern part of their range than in the southern, but it is also found as shallow as 30 m (98 ft) off California. Spotted ratfish tend to move closer to shallow water during the spring and autumn, then to deeper water in summer and winter. For most of the year, they prefer temperatures between 7.2 and 8.9 °C (45 and 48 °F), but seasonally they do move into slightly warmer water. They can most commonly be found living near the sea floor in sandy, muddy, or rocky reef environments. Unlike most of its relatives, which are entirely restricted to deep waters, the spotted ratfish has been held in public aquaria. It has also been bred in such aquaria, where two of the main issues are the requirements of low light and low temperature (generally kept at 8–12 °C or 46–54 °F).

== Diet ==
The spotted ratfish swims slowly above the seafloor in search of food. Location of food is done by smell. Their usual hunting period is at night, when they move to shallow water to feed. They are particularly drawn to crunchy foods such as crabs and clams. Besides these, the spotted ratfish also feeds on shrimp, worms, small fish, small crustaceans, and sea stars. Species known to prey on the spotted ratfish include soupfin sharks, dogfish sharks, Pacific halibut, pinnipeds, and pigeon guillemots.

== Reproduction ==
Like some sharks, spotted ratfish are oviparous. Their spawning season peaks during the spring to autumn. During this time, the female releases up to two fertilized eggs into sand or mud areas of the seabed every 10–14 days. The extrusion process can last 18–30 hours and the actual laying can last another 4–6 days. The egg sack is leather-like, 12.7 cm (5.0 in) long, and has a filament connected to it which is used to attach it to the ocean floor when it is let go by the mother. A female may be seen swimming around her newly laid eggs, in hopes of preventing predators from finding them. Development of the egg can take up to a year, which can be dangerous because the eggs are sometimes mistaken for inanimate objects by divers. When the young finally hatch, they are about 14 cm (5.5 in) in length and grow, reaching 30 cm (12 in) in length their first year. In captivity, H colliei have been observed laying a pair of eggs every 7–10 days.

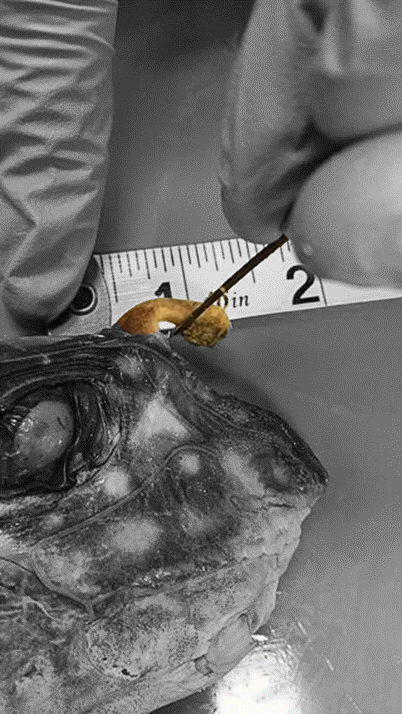
The cephalic clasper, or frontal tentaculum, of the spotted ratfish chimaera is shown in color.

Male spotted ratfish have multiple secondary sexual characteristics, which include paired pelvic claspers, a single frontal tentaculum, and paired pelvic tentacula. The pelvic claspers are located on the ventral side of the fish. They protrude out from the pelvic fins and are responsible for the movement of sperm to the oviduct of the female. The interior of the pelvic clasper is supported by cartilage and separates into two branches, ultimately ending in a fleshy lobe on the posterior end.

The cephalic clasper (tentaculum) is a unique, club-like organ not found in any other vertebrate. The cephalic clasper is located on the head of the fish, just anterior to the eyes. The tip of the retractable organ is fleshy and lined with numerous small, sharp barbs. For the male to stay attached during courtship, the clasper has been observed to clamp down on the pectoral fin of the female. Additional evidence for this use has been found in the form of scars and scratches on the dorsal sides of females. The significantly smaller body size of males, which is a sexually dimorphic characteristic, may be a contributing factor to this mating behavior.

== Behaviour ==
The ratfish prefers to maintain a safe distance from divers, and are usually not aggressive. However, if they feel their territory has been invaded, they are able to inflict a mildly toxic wound with their dorsal fin spines. As they swim, they perform barrel rolls and corkscrew turns, as if they are flying. Ratfish swim using large pectoral fins, and this has often been termed aquatic flight given the resemblance to a bird. H colliei have been found to segregate by both sex and age, with juveniles found to occur in deeper waters.

== Albino Puget Sound ratfish ==
A rare albino Puget Sound ratfish was discovered near Whidbey Island, Washington. It is the only pure albino among the 7.2 million specimens in the University of Washington's fish collection.
