= Owston's chimaera =

Conservation status
- Data Deficient (IUCN 3.1)

Scientific classification
- Kingdom: Animalia
- Phylum: Chordata
- Class: Chondrichthyes
- Subclass: Holocephali
- Order: Chimaeriformes
- Family: Chimaeridae
- Genus: Chimaera
- Species: C. owstoni

Binomial name
- Chimaera owstoni S. Tanaka (I), 1905,

Species of fish

Owston's chimaera, Chimaera owstoni, is a species of fish in the family Chimaeridae endemic to Japan. Its natural habitat is open seas.

Chimaera owstoni, is a medium sized species (reaching at least 797.0 mm TL, 471.0 mm BDL). It is distinguished from other members of its species by its small head compared to its elongated body, it curved dorsal fin, and its teardrop shaped pelvic fin.
