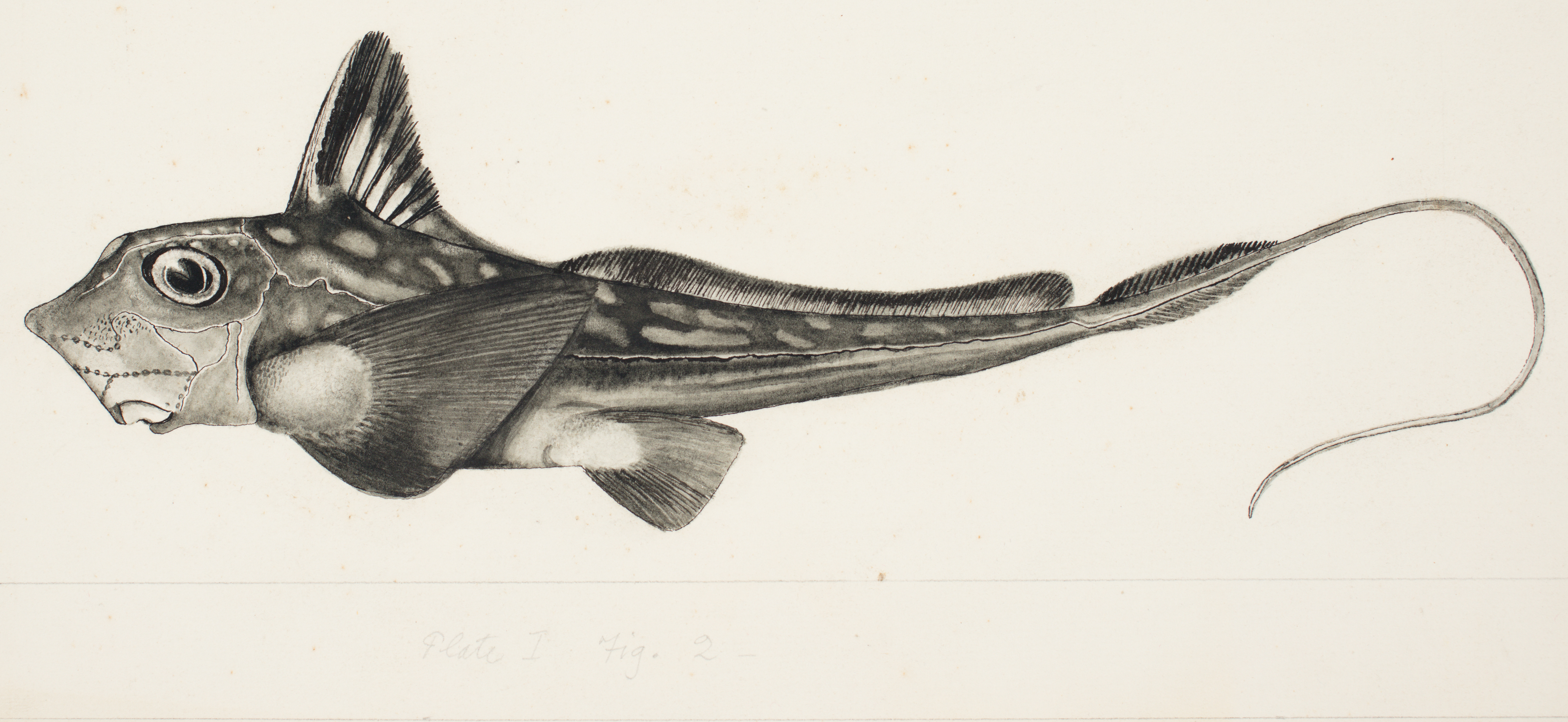
- 1921 illustration by Louis Thomas Griffin

Conservation status
- Least Concern (IUCN 3.1)

Scientific classification
- Kingdom: Animalia
- Phylum: Chordata
- Class: Chondrichthyes
- Subclass: Holocephali
- Order: Chimaeriformes
- Family: Chimaeridae
- Genus: Hydrolagus
- Species: H. novaezealandiae

Binomial name
- Hydrolagus novaezealandiae (Fowler, 1911)

= Dark ghostshark =

Species of cartilaginous fish

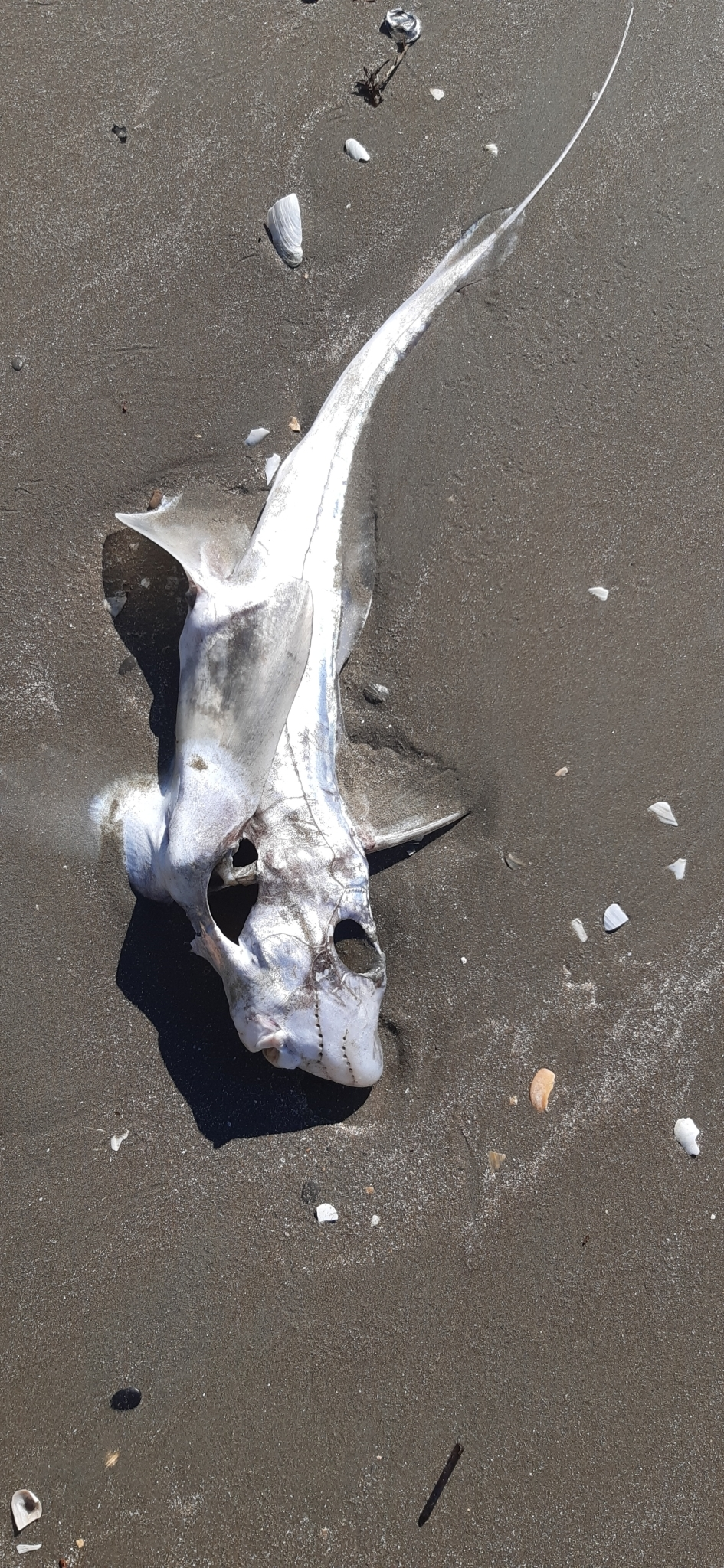
A beached specimen of Hydrolagus novaezealandiae found in Marlborough

The dark ghostshark (Hydrolagus novaezealandiae) is a shortnose chimaera of the family Chimaeridae, found on the continental shelf around the South Island of New Zealand. In June 2018 the New Zealand Department of Conservation classified the dark ghostshark as "Not Threatened" under the New Zealand Threat Classification System.
