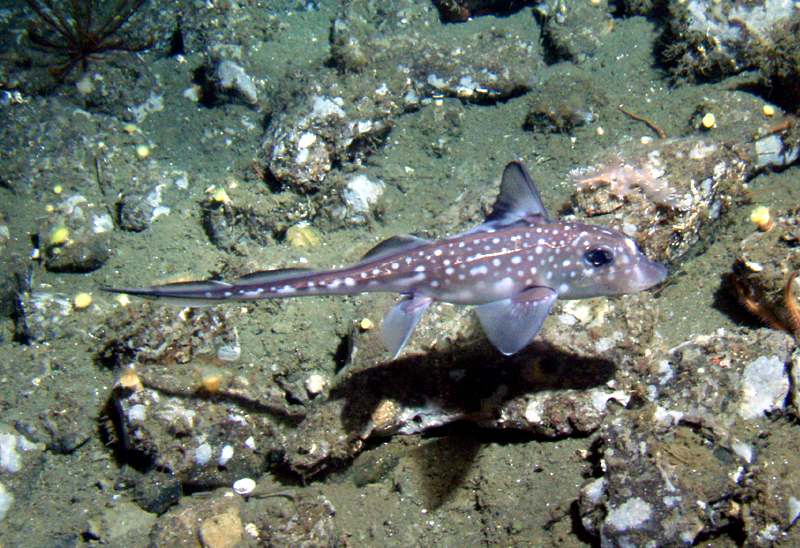
- Hydrolagus colliei

Scientific classification
- Kingdom: Animalia
- Phylum: Chordata
- Class: Chondrichthyes
- Subclass: Holocephali
- Order: Chimaeriformes
- Family: Chimaeridae
- Genus: Hydrolagus; T. N. Gill, 1862

Type species
- Chimaera colliei Lay & Bennett, 1839

= Hydrolagus =

Hydrolagus Temporal range: Miocene–Recent

Genus of cartilaginous fishes

Hydrolagus is a genus of fish in the family Chimaeridae found in the Atlantic, Indian and Pacific Oceans.

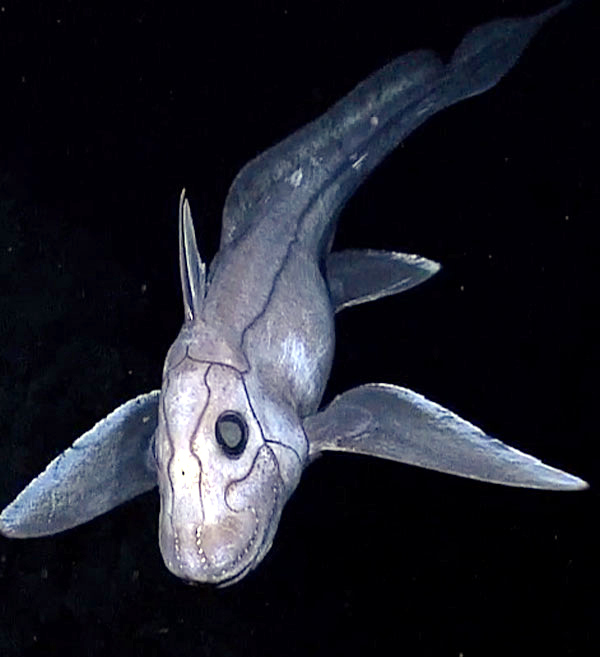
Deep-sea chimaera photographed by the NOAAS Okeanos Explorer. Visible on its snout are tiny pores which lead to electroreceptor cells.

== Species ==
The 22 recognized species in this genus are:

- Hydrolagus affinis (Brito Capello (pt), 1868) (small-eyed rabbitfish)
- Hydrolagus africanus (Gilchrist, 1922) (African chimaera)
- Hydrolagus alberti Bigelow & Schroeder, 1951 (gulf chimaera)
- Hydrolagus alphus Quaranta, Didier, Long & Ebert, 2006 (whitespot ghost shark)
- Hydrolagus barbouri (Garman, 1908) (ninespot chimaera)
- Hydrolagus bemisi Didier, 2002 (pale ghostshark)
- Hydrolagus colliei (G. T. Lay & E. T. Bennett, 1839) (spotted ratfish)
- Hydrolagus eidolon D. S. Jordan & C. L. Hubbs, 1925 (Niji Chimaera)
- Hydrolagus erithacus Walovich, Ebert & Kemper, 2017 (Robin's ghostshark)
- Hydrolagus homonycteris Didier, 2008 (black ghostshark)
- Hydrolagus lusitanicus T. Moura, I. M. R. Figueiredo, Bordalo-Machado, A. C. Almeida & Serrano-Gordo, 2005 (Portuguese chimaera)
- Hydrolagus macrophthalmus F. de Buen, 1959 (bigeye chimaera)
- Hydrolagus marmoratus Didier, 2008 (marbled ghost shark)
- Hydrolagus matallanasi Soto & Vooren, 2004 (striped rabbitfish)
- Hydrolagus mccoskeri L. A. K. Barnett, Didier, Long & Ebert, 2006 (Galápagos ghostshark)
- Hydrolagus melanophasma K. C. James, Ebert, Long & Didier, 2009 (Eastern Pacific black ghostshark)
- Hydrolagus mirabilis (Collett, 1904) (large-eyed rabbitfish)
- Hydrolagus mitsukurii (D. S. Jordan & Snyder, 1904) (Mitsukuri's chimaera)
- Hydrolagus novaezealandiae (Fowler, 1911) (dark ghostshark)
- Hydrolagus pallidus Hardy & Stehmann, 1990 (pale chimaera)
- Hydrolagus purpurescens (C. H. Gilbert, 1905) (purple chimaera)
- Hydrolagus trolli Didier & Séret (fr), 2002 (abyssal ghostshark)

Fossil remains of the genus are known from the Miocene and Pliocene of California.
