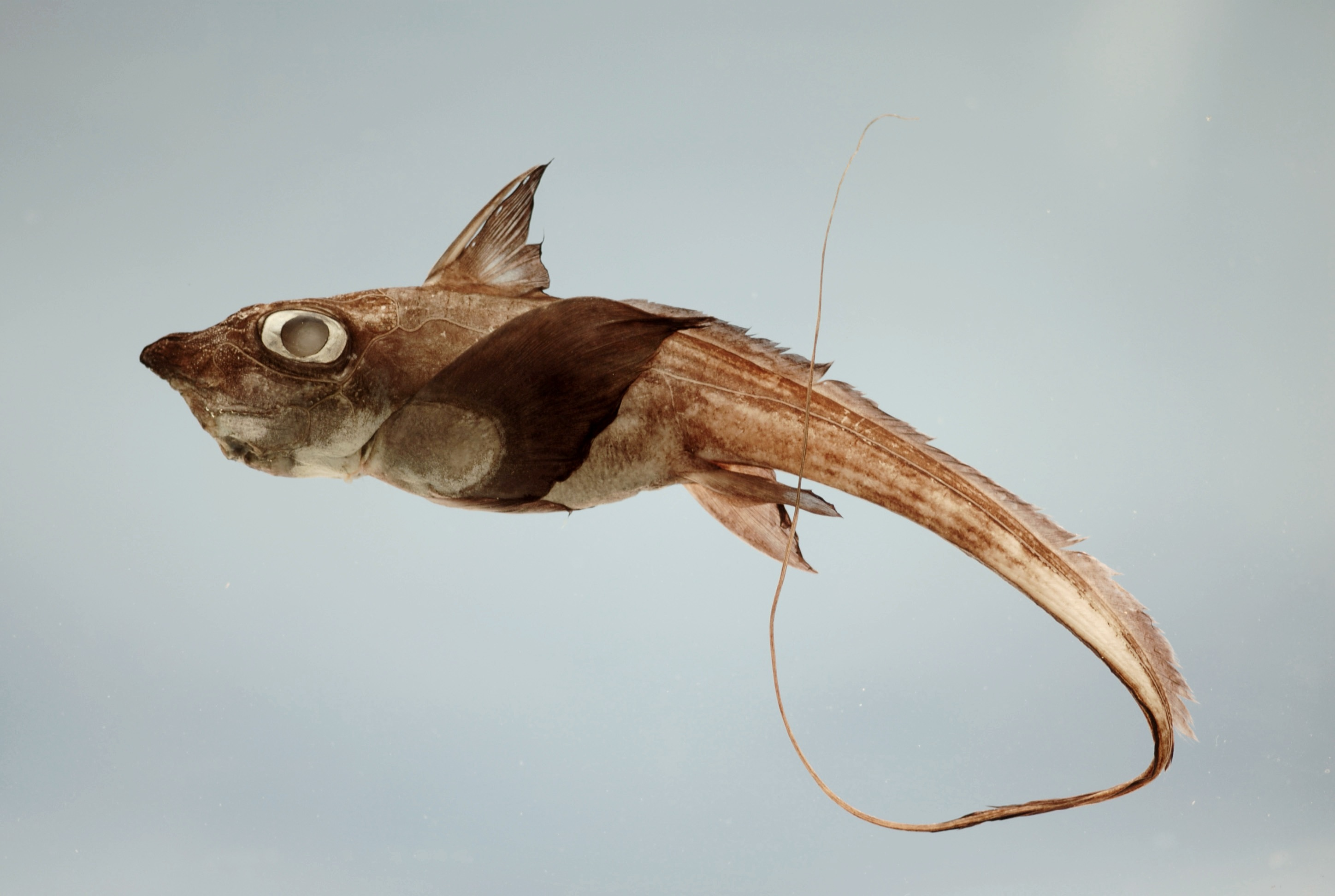
- Hydrolagus alberti

Scientific classification
- Kingdom: Animalia
- Phylum: Chordata
- Class: Chondrichthyes
- Subclass: Holocephali
- Order: Chimaeriformes
- Family: Chimaeridae; Bonaparte, 1831

Genera
- Chimaera; Hydrolagus

= Chimaeridae =

Chimaeridae Temporal range: Eocene–Recent

Family of cartilaginous fishes

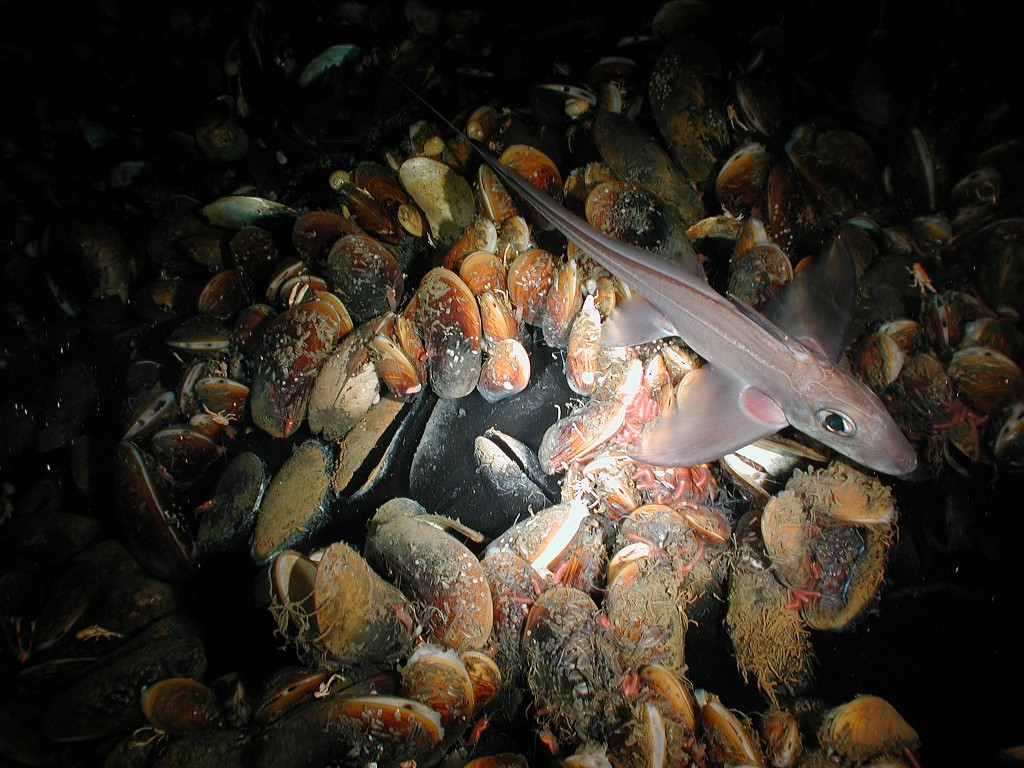
A Chimaeridae fish and deepwater mussels at edge of a brine pool.

The Chimaeridae, or short-nosed chimaeras, are a family of cartilaginous fish.

They resemble other chimaeras in general form and habits, but have short, rounded snouts, without the modifications found in related families. Many species have long, tapering tails, giving them an alternative name of ratfish. Shortnose chimaeras have a venomous spine on their backs, which is sufficiently dangerous to injure humans.

They are found in temperate and tropical marine waters worldwide. Most species are restricted to depths below 200 m (660 ft), but a few, notably the spotted ratfish and rabbit fish, can locally be found at relatively shallow depths. They range from 38 to 150 cm (1.25 to 4.92 ft) in maximum total length, depending on species.

== Species ==
The species are grouped into two genera and include:

Family Chimaeridae

- Genus Chimaera Linnaeus, 1758 (Eocene-Recent)
  - Chimaera argiloba Last, White, & Pogonoski, 2008 (whitefin chimaera)
  - Chimaera bahamaensis Kemper, Ebert, Didier & Compagno, 2010 (Bahamas ghostshark)
  - Chimaera carophila Kemper, Ebert, Naylor & Didier 2015 (brown chimaera)
  - Chimaera cubana Howell-Rivero, 1936 (Cuban chimaera)
  - Chimaera fulva Didier, Last & W. T. White, 2008 (southern chimaera)
  - Chimaera jordani S. Tanaka (I), 1905 (Jordan's chimaera)
  - Chimaera lignaria Didier, 2002 (Carpenter's chimaera)
  - Chimaera macrospina Didier, Last, & White, 2008 (longspine chimaera)
  - Chimaera monstrosa Linnaeus, 1758 (Rabbitfish)
  - Chimaera notafricana Kemper, Ebert, Compagno & Didier, 2010 (Cape chimaera)
  - Chimaera obscura Didier, Last, & White, 2008 (shortspine chimaera)
  - Chimaera owstoni S. Tanaka (I), 1905 (Owston's chimaera)
  - Chimaera panthera Didier, 1998 (leopard chimaera)
  - Chimaera phantasma D. S. Jordan & Snyder, 1900 (silver chimaera)
  - Chimaera stellata Teramura, Senou, & Hirase, 2024 (stellated chimaera)
  - Chimaera supapae Ebert, Krajangdara, Fahmi, & Kemper, 2024 (Andaman shortnose chimaera)
  - Chimaera cf. sp. E Last & Stevens, 1994; White et al. 2006 (Lombok chimaera)
- Genus Hydrolagus Gill, 1863 (Miocene-Recent)
  - Hydrolagus affinis (Brito Capello, 1868) (small-eyed rabbitfish)
  - Hydrolagus africanus (Gilchrist, 1922) (African chimaera)
  - Hydrolagus alberti Bigelow & Schroeder, 1951 (Gulf chimaera)
  - Hydrolagus alphus Quaranta, Didier, Long & Ebert, 2006
  - Hydrolagus barbouri (Garman, 1908) (ninespot chimaera)
  - Hydrolagus bemisi Didier, 2002 (pale ghost shark)
  - Hydrolagus colliei (Lay & E. T. Bennett, 1839) (spotted ratfish)
  - Hydrolagus eidolon (D. S. Jordan & C. L. Hubbs, 1925)
  - Hydrolagus erithacus Walovich, Ebert & Kemper, 2017 (Robin's ghostshark)
  - Hydrolagus homonycteris Didier, 2008 (black ghostshark)
  - Hydrolagus lemures (Whitley, 1939) (bight ghostshark)
  - Hydrolagus lusitanicus T. Moura, I. M. R. Figueiredo, Bordalo-Machado, C. Almeida & Gordo, 2005 (Portuguese rabbitfish)
  - Hydrolagus macrophthalmus F. de Buen, 1959 (big-eyed chimaera)
  - Hydrolagus marmoratus Didier, 2008 (marbled ghostshark)
  - Hydrolagus matallanasi Soto & Vooren, 2004 (striped rabbitfish)
  - Hydrolagus mccoskeri L. A. K. Barnett, Didier, Long & Ebert, 2006 (Galápagos ghostshark)
  - Hydrolagus melanophasma K. C. James, Ebert, Long & Didier, 2009 (Eastern Pacific black ghostshark)
  - Hydrolagus mirabilis (Collett, 1904) (large-eyed rabbitfish)
  - Hydrolagus mitsukurii (D. S. Jordan & Snyder, 1904) (spookfish)
  - Hydrolagus novaezealandiae (Fowler, 1911) (dark ghostshark)
  - Hydrolagus ogilbyi (Waite, 1898) (Ogilby's ghostshark)
  - Hydrolagus pallidus Hardy & Stehmann, 1990 (pale chimaera)
  - Hydrolagus purpurescens (C. H. Gilbert, 1905) (purple chimaera)
  - Hydrolagus trolli Didier & Séret, 2002 (pointy-nosed blue chimaera)
  - Hydrolagus waitei Fowler, 1907
  - Hydrolagus sp. D/G (giant black chimaera)
  - Hydrolagus sp. F (Peruvian rabbitfish)
- †Canadodus Popov, Johns & Suntok, 2020 Sooke Formation, Canada, Oligocene
