= Graytail skate =

Conservation status
- Endangered (IUCN 3.1)

Scientific classification
- Kingdom: Animalia
- Phylum: Chordata
- Class: Chondrichthyes
- Subclass: Elasmobranchii
- Order: Rajiformes
- Family: Arhynchobatidae
- Genus: Bathyraja
- Species: B. griseocauda

Binomial name
- Bathyraja griseocauda (Norman, 1937)
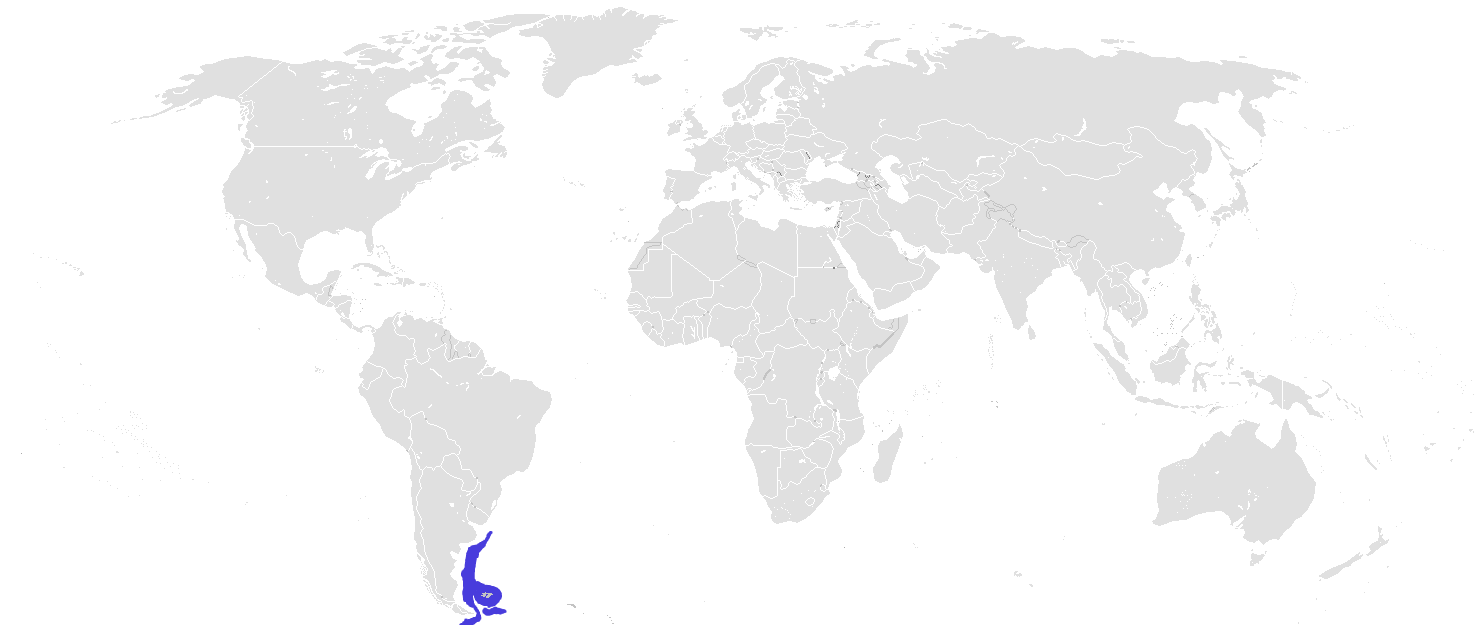

Synonyms
- Raja griseocauda Norman, 1937

Species of cartilaginous fish

The graytail skate (Bathyraja griseocauda), or gray tail skate, is a large species of skate in the family Arhynchobatidae, native to the south-western Atlantic Ocean and south-eastern Pacific Ocean. It is listed as endangered by the IUCN. It was caught as part of a commercial fishery around the Falkland Islands and is a bycatch in several other fisheries.

== Range and distribution ==
In the Atlantic Ocean, the graytail skate is found off the coast of Argentina and in the waters surrounding the Falkland Islands. The northern extent of its range in the Atlantic is 37 degrees South. Its range extends very slightly past Cape Horn into the Pacific Ocean, off the coast of Chile, but does not extend beyond a northern extent of 41 degrees South.

Although graytail skates have been found in waters as shallow as 51 metres (167 ft), they are most often found deeper than 250 metres (820 ft). They are found all over the continental shelf surrounding the Falkland Islands, but are found in highest concentration in the western, deeper shelf margin.

Individuals also segregate spatially by age class. Nursery grounds near the Falkland Islands are generally located at depths of 300-350m. Juveniles are found in deeper water, 400 to 600 metres (1,300 to 2,000 ft), but migrate either to the upper slope (200 to 400 metres (660 to 1,310 ft)) or into deeper water (below 600 metres (2,000 ft)) after growing to 40 to 45 centimetres (16 to 18 in) in length.

The current population size of the graytail skate is not known. However the catch per unit effort has declined from 1993-2001, as well as a decrease in size. These indicators led to the partial closure of the fishery around the Falklands, although no assessments have been completed to gauge current status. The frequency of bycatch and slow growth rate have led fisheries scientists to believe the fisheries restriction has not reversed the decline.

== Biology and description ==
Recent reports indicate the graytail skate grows to a length of approximately 130 centimetres (51 in), with a maximum reported length of 157 centimetres (62 in). The disc width is generally less than the total length, growing to a maximum width of approximately 90 centimetres (35 in). An earlier study found mature individuals to be considerably smaller. The dorsal surface is black-brown and is covered by denticles but lacks spines. The ventral surface is yellowish with dark spots near the tail. The tail has 19-27 large spines.

The graytail skate is a slow-growing species, growing 4 to 6 centimetres (1.6 to 2.4 in) per year. This is slower than most species in the genus Bathyraja. The maximum observed age is 28 years. Sexual maturity is reached at approximately 18 years for females and 14 years for males. The sex ratio is slightly skewed toward female.

Like most skates, the graytail skate is oviparious, laying paired eggs with horn-like projections. It spawns year-round, although lays fewer eggs in the winter.

Younger individuals eat primarily amphipods and other crustaceans and polychaete worms. These disappear from the diet as the individual ages. Older individuals eat rajids, ray-finned fish, and cephalopods.

=== Taxonomy ===
Initially classified in the genus Raja, the graytail skate was reclassified as Bathyraja in 1971, a genus which did not exist in 1947. This classification was supported by a morphological phylogenetic analysis and genetically. It is closely related to the butterfly skate, Bathyraja papilionifera, based on similarity of mtDNA fragments from Cytochrome c oxidase subunit I.

== Fisheries ==
The graytail skate was the largest component of the rajid catch in the Falkland Island from 1993 to 2001. It comprised 24.2% of the harvest, followed by the white-dotted skate, B. albomaculata, and the broadnose skate, B. brachyurops. It is also a bycatch in trawler fisheries targeting teleosts, and long line fisheries targeting patagonian toothfish. Fisheries may be based in the Falkland Islands, Argentina, or Chile.

=== Management ===
The Falkland Islands instituted a management plan in 1994. The plan identifies two mix-species fisheries, one north and one south of the Falklands. Fishing for rajids in the north requires a license, while it has been prohibited in the south since 1996. As of 2005, Argentina had not instituted an elasmobranch management plan.
