= Peruvian skate =

Conservation status
- Least Concern (IUCN 3.1)

Scientific classification
- Kingdom: Animalia
- Phylum: Chordata
- Class: Chondrichthyes
- Subclass: Elasmobranchii
- Order: Rajiformes
- Family: Arhynchobatidae
- Genus: Bathyraja
- Species: B. peruana

Binomial name
- Bathyraja peruana J. D. McEachran & T. Miyake, 1984

Species of cartilaginous fish

The Peruvian skate (Bathyraja peruana) is a large skate found in the southeast Pacific Ocean, off the coasts of Peru, Ecuador, and Chile. It can grow to an estimated 1.1 metres (3 ft 7 in) total length, and 1.25 m (4 ft 1 in) across. It is known to be a deepwater species; the holotype was caught at a depth of 908 m (2,979 ft), and is generally found at depths of 600–1,100 m (2,000–3,600 ft). Very little is known about its biology.

== Description ==
It has a lozenge-shaped disc and a maximum length of 1.1 m (3 ft 7 in). The margin of the disc is almost straight from the tip of the snout to the tip of the disc, with a slight convexity from the level of the nostrils to the level of the gills. The straight disc margin can be used to distinguish B. peruana from B. aguja which has undulating margins. Coloration on most of the surface is brownish-grey, but ranges from brown to yellow on the margins of the nostrils, mouth, pelvic fins, and base of the tail. The disc has dermal denticles but generally lacks thorns (some specimens have small thorns just anterior to the axil of the pectoral fins). The tail has 25 small, oval-based midrow thorns.
