= Fishing in the Falkland Islands =

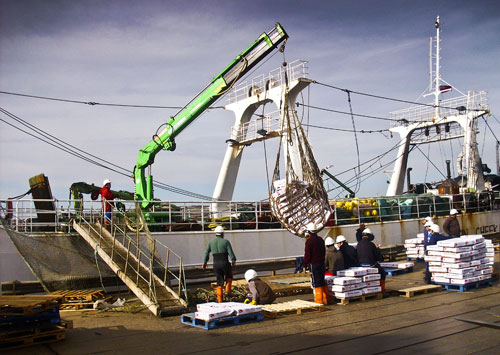
Trawler, Falkland Islands

Fishing in the Falkland Islands contributes to the local economy, representing one of its biggest exports.

The official body responsible for the sustainable development of fisheries in the Falklands is the Department of Natural Resources, Falkland Islands Fisheries Department (FIFD), established in 1987. It is reported that during 2013 the Loligo fishery had the best results. The waters around the Falkland Islands, known as the Falklands Inner Conservation Zone (FICZ) and Falklands Outer Conservation Zone (FOCZ) are Policed by the Fisheries Protection Vessel Lilibet. FPV Lilibet is a civilian crewed Damen Stan 5009 patrol ship with a maximum speed of up to 29.5 knots (54.6 km/h; 33.9 mph) and a crew of up to 28 persons. She has an endurance of 30 days. If patrolling at 10 knots she can reportedly operate for 30 days with a range of up to 7,000 nautical miles. She is fitted with two Browning .50 calibre heavy machine gun mounts though she routinely deploys unarmed.

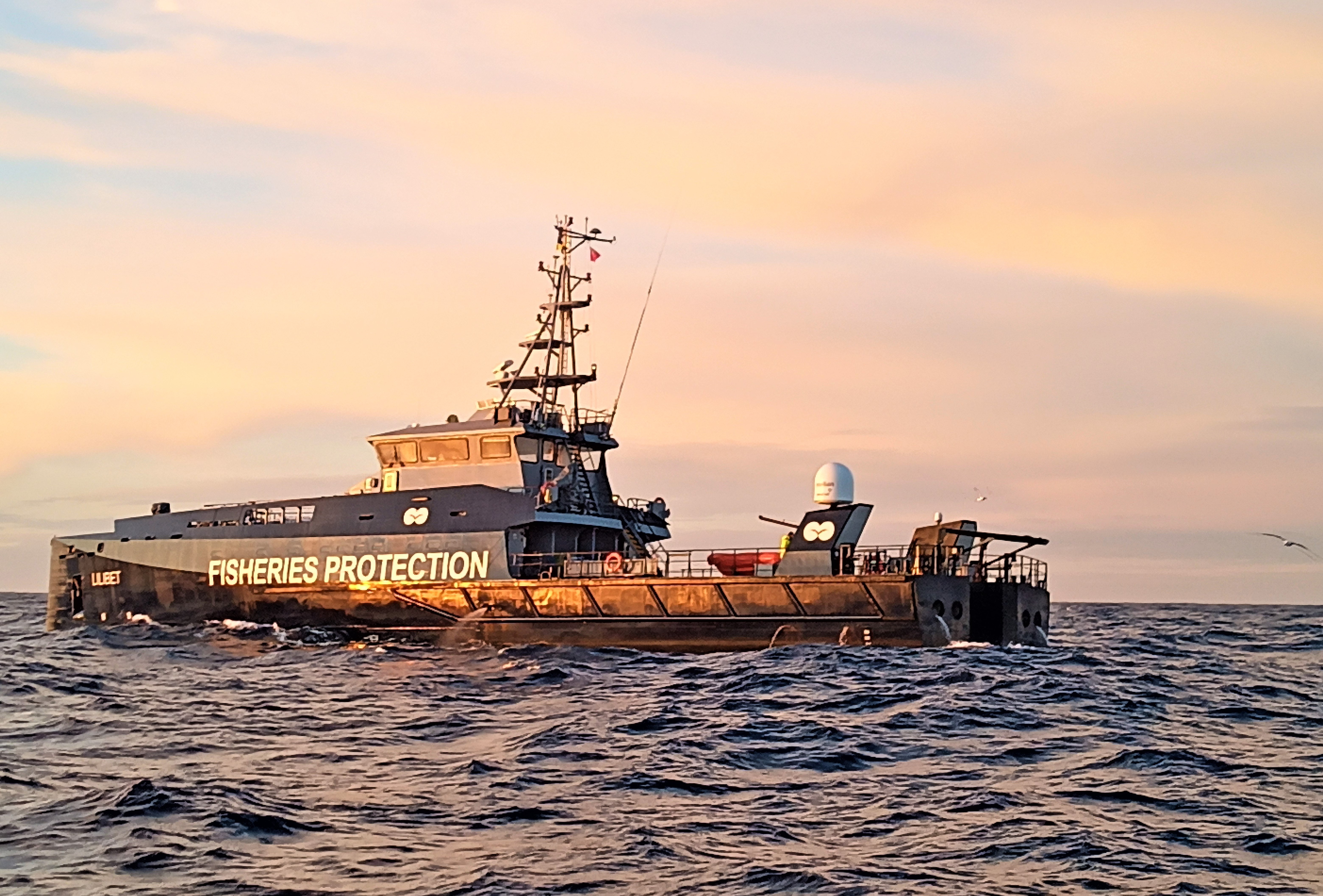
The Falkland Islands Fisheries Protection Vessel Lilibet on patrol in the South Atlantic

== History ==
The Fisheries law introduced in 1987 was substantially revised in 2005 with the introduction of the Fisheries (Conservation and Management) Ordinance 2005. Fish farming licenses were addressed in 2006 with the establishment of the Marine Farming Ordinance. At the height of the fishing season, January to June, there are up to 135 vessels fishing in the waters around the Falkland Islands. These come from a variety of countries including Taiwan, South Korea, Spain, Vanuatu and the Falkland Islands. According to a study conducted in 2008, the island fisheries were identified as one of the best in the world in terms of its scientific strength and environmentally enduring. As of 2014, the Falkland Islands do not have a national personal fishing license; however, there are daily catch limits per person per day: on the Murrell River, the daily limit is three trout, while everywhere else, it is six trout.

== Production ==
Squid fishing has accounted for about 75% of the total yield of 200,000 tonnes, which is exported to Europe and the Far East. The other 25% includes finfish species such as Rock Cod, Hake, Hoki and Toothfish. Brown trout fishing is common, and fish caught can be particularly sizable; the record for the largest sea trout caught in the Falklands is held by Alison Faulkner at 22lbs 12.5 oz (roughly 10. 3 kg).

D. gahi squid is exclusively fished in the island waters. The average annual revenue from fisheries is reported to be £20 million though during the recent years annual yields have declined to £12-15 million. Loligo gahi is an important squid species fished in the eastern and southern part called the "Falkland Shelf", in an area known as the "Loligo box".

The island is reported to have 18 Falkland Islands registered ocean going fishing vessels, 17 Trawlers and 1 Longliner and is capable of meeting 10% requirement of squid fishes in the world. There are special squid jigging vessels which can fish Illex argentinus squid. Trawlers are used for fishing Doryteuthis (gahi squid) are under the joint ownership of Falklands and European companies. Korean trawlers have fished here and found about 12 species of skates and rays which include Bathyraja griseocauda, Bathyraja albomaculata, Bathyraja brachyurops and Dipturus chilensis.
