= Bathyraja chapmani =

Chapman's skate

Scientific classification
- Kingdom: Animalia
- Phylum: Chordata
- Class: Chondrichthyes
- Subclass: Elasmobranchii
- Order: Rajiformes
- Family: Arhynchobatidae
- Genus: Bathyraja
- Species: B. chapmani

Binomial name
- Bathyraja chapmani D. A. Ebert, J. Alfaro-Shigueto, X. Velez-Zuazo, M. Pajuelo, and J.C. Mangel, 2022

Species of fish

Bathyraja chapmani, commonly known as Chapman's skate, is a species of deep-sea skate in the family Arhynchobatidae. This species was described in 2022 by D.A. Ebert, J. Alfaro-Shigueto, X. Velez-Zuazo, M. Pajuelo, and J.C. Mangel.

== Size ==
This species reaches a length of 113.0 cm (44.5 in).

== Distinctive features ==
This large species has a rhombic disc with a uniform black-to-chocolate or dark-plumbrown coloration, notably the same on both dorsal and ventral surfaces. It also has an irregular spotted pattern on both dorsal and ventral surfaces.

== Fin structure ==
Dorsal spines: 7; Dorsal soft rays: 9; Anal spines: 1; Anal soft rays: 8.

== Distribution ==
Found in the southeastern Pacific Ocean, specifically off the coast of Lima, Peru.

== Environment ==
Marine; bathydemersal; depth range 1,714 metres (5,620 ft). They inhabit deep-water environments.

== Etymology ==
The genus name Bathyraja is derived from Greek, with "bathys" meaning deep and Latin "raja" meaning a ray. The species name "chapmani" is in honor of Demian Chapman, the Senior Scientist & Director, at the Center for Shark Research, at Mote Marine Laboratory & Aquarium in Sarasota, Florida, USA, for his contributions to shark and ray conservation and research.

== Diet ==
Feeds on small invertebrates and other marine organisms.

== Reproduction ==
Information on their reproductive behavior is limited, but they are known to produce eggs.

== Conservation status ==
IUCN Status: Not Evaluated.

CITES: Not listed.
