= Bathyraja panthera =

Scientific classification
- Kingdom: Animalia
- Phylum: Chordata
- Class: Chondrichthyes
- Subclass: Elasmobranchii
- Order: Rajiformes
- Family: Arhynchobatidae
- Genus: Bathyraja
- Species: B. panthera

Binomial name
- Bathyraja panthera Orr, Stevenson, Hoff, Spies & McEachran, 2011

Species of cartilaginous fish

Bathyraja panthera, the leopard skate, is a species of cartilaginous fish in the family Arhynchobatidae. It was first described as a new species in 2011, having been discovered in the Aleutian Islands at depths between 50 and 258 m (164 and 846 ft). It is a moderately large species with a short snout and wide mouth. The dorsal surface is pale greenish-brown, with speckling, round black spots and yellow blotches, giving it its specific name panthera from its resemblance to a leopard skin. It is an egg-bearing species, the eggs being enclosed in egg capsules with horns at the corners.

== Description ==
This moderately large skate has a disc that is 1.3 times as broad as long. The total length (TL) of the described species is between 197 mm and 1110 mm, the disc length is between 514 mm and 586 mm, the disc width is between 640 mm and 743 mm and the tail length is between 440 mm and 541 mm. The snout is short, the mouth width is about 15.6% of the disc width, with about 34 (31-42) thorns on the mid-dorsal line from the nuchal to the tip of the tail (nuchal: 4 (2-5), mid-dorsal: 7 (6-10), scapular: 2 (1-2), tail: 22 (19-28)).

The species is oviparous. The egg capsules are large (between 106 mm and 134 mm) with a horn at each corner.

The background colour is light greenish brown, with vermiculated and round black spots and yellow blotches.

This species was named after the generic name for the leopard (Felidae), because the dorsal coloration of the species is often characterized by rosettes of black spots surrounding yellow blotches.

The holotype is housed in the University of Washington, College of Ocean and Fishery Sciences, Seattle, USA (collection number UW 116980).

== Distribution ==
This species is known from the western Aleutian Islands (Pacific Ocean, Bering Sea) or on Petrel Bank between longitudes 170° E and 179° W. All described specimens were collected at depths ranging from 51 m to 258 m.
