= Brochiraja aenigma =

Conservation status
- Data Deficient (IUCN 3.1)

Scientific classification
- Kingdom: Animalia
- Phylum: Chordata
- Class: Chondrichthyes
- Subclass: Elasmobranchii
- Order: Rajiformes
- Family: Arhynchobatidae
- Genus: Brochiraja
- Species: B. aenigma

Binomial name
- Brochiraja aenigma (Last & McEachran, 2006)

Species of cartilaginous fish

Brochiraja aenigma, also known as the Enigma skate, is a skate known from a single specimen recently identified in 2006. Based on the single specimen, its range includes at least the Wanganella Bank on the Norfolk Ridge. It is rare with further searches finding no specimens, and while it is not commonly fished or reported in commercial distribution, it can be used for fish meal.

Due to the limited knowledge of its biology and extent of capture in fisheries, this species is assessed as Data Deficient by the IUCN.
