= Bathyraja andriashevi =

Little-eyed skate

Conservation status
- Least Concern (IUCN 3.1)

Scientific classification
- Kingdom: Animalia
- Phylum: Chordata
- Class: Chondrichthyes
- Subclass: Elasmobranchii
- Order: Rajiformes
- Family: Arhynchobatidae
- Genus: Bathyraja
- Species: B. andriashevi

Binomial name
- Bathyraja andriashevi Dolganov, 1983

Species of fish

Bathyraja andriashevi, the little-eyed skate, is a species of skate in the family Arhynchobatidae found in the western Pacific Ocean.

== Size ==
This species reaches a length of 75.6 cm (29.8 in).

== Etymology ==
The fish is named in honor of Soviet ichthyologist Anatoly Petrovich Andriashev (1910–2009).
