= Longnose deep-sea skate =

Conservation status
- Data Deficient (IUCN 3.1)

Scientific classification
- Kingdom: Animalia
- Phylum: Chordata
- Class: Chondrichthyes
- Subclass: Elasmobranchii
- Order: Rajiformes
- Family: Arhynchobatidae
- Genus: Bathyraja
- Species: B. shuntovi

Binomial name
- Bathyraja shuntovi Dolganov, 1985

Species of cartilaginous fish

The longnose deep-sea skate (Bathyraja shuntovi) is a large skate in the family Arhynchobatidae. It was first described in 1985 from specimens collected near New Zealand. It is known to be a deep-water skate, however lack of research trawls at depths past 1500 meters limits knowledge of the depths where the species can be found. The species is dark brown or grey, with an eponymous elongated snout. The species has been measured to be a maximum of 140 cm in total length, although size variation and growth patterns are not known.

== Etymology ==
The skate was named in honor of Vyacheslav P. Shuntov (b. 1937), who was the chief scientist of the Pacific Institute of Scientific Fisheries and Oceanography Center in Vladivostok, where the author was working at the time.

== Conservation status ==
The New Zealand Department of Conservation has classified the longnose deep-sea skate as "Not Threatened" under the New Zealand Threat Classification System.
