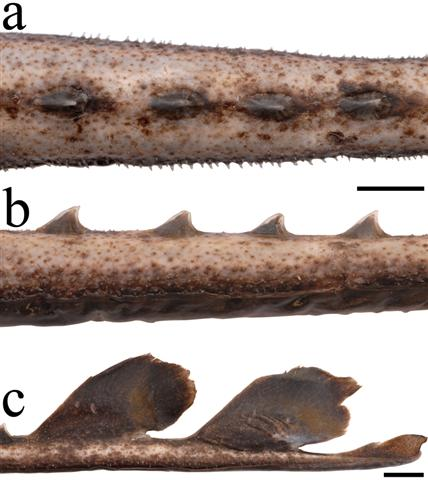

Scientific classification
- Domain: Eukaryota
- Kingdom: Animalia
- Phylum: Chordata
- Class: Chondrichthyes
- Subclass: Elasmobranchii
- Order: Rajiformes
- Family: Arhynchobatidae
- Genus: Bathyraja
- Species: B. leucomelanos

Binomial name
- Bathyraja leucomelanos Iglésias & Lévy-Hartman, 2012

= Bathyraja leucomelanos =

Species of cartilaginous fish

Bathyraja leucomelanos, commonly known as domino skate, is a species of softnose skate, closely related to Bathyraja spinicauda. The complete range is not known, however the holotype specimen of B. leucomelanos was caught on the Coriolis Bank, off western New Caledonia in 2002. The male holotype specimen measures 888 millimetres (35 in) total length and 608 mm (24 in) across the disc. Dorsal coloration is mostly white, with black on the disc and tail margins. Ventral coloration is black.

The tail has 18 laterally compressed spines, the dorsal surface is covered in denticles, while the ventral surface lacks denticles.
