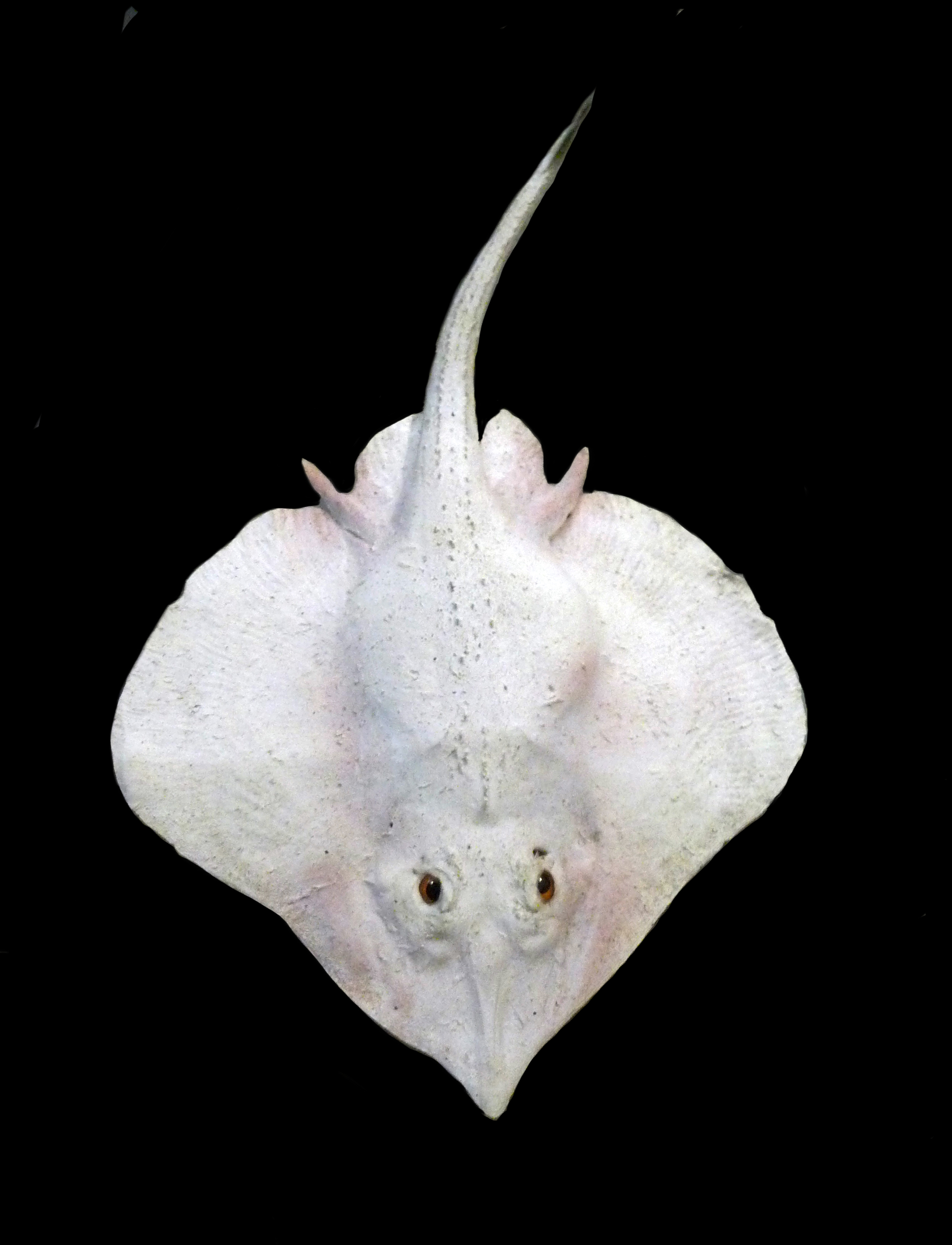

Conservation status
- Least Concern (IUCN 3.1)

Scientific classification
- Kingdom: Animalia
- Phylum: Chordata
- Class: Chondrichthyes
- Subclass: Elasmobranchii
- Order: Rajiformes
- Family: Arhynchobatidae
- Genus: Bathyraja
- Species: B. spinosissima

Binomial name
- Bathyraja spinosissima (Beebe & Tee-Van, 1941)

Synonyms
- Psammobatus spinosissimus Beebe & Tee-Van, 1941

= Pacific white skate =

Species of cartilaginous fish

The Pacific white skate (Bathyraja spinosissima) is a species of skate in the family Arhynchobatidae. It is one of the deepest-living of all skates, occurring at a depth of 800 to 2,906m (2,600 and 9,500 feet) on the continental slope. It is native to the southeast Pacific Ocean from the Galapagos Islands to off Waldport, Oregon; an egg case and embryo have been collected from the Farallon Islands off San Francisco. In 2023, the largest nursery of the species was discovered off the Pacific coast of Canada.

== Biology ==
The flattened pectoral fin disc of the Pacific white skate is slightly wider than long, with broadly rounded tips. The disc is covered with numerous small denticles above and below, giving it a shagreen-like texture. Adult males possess alar spines (on the dorsal surface of the pectoral fins near the tips). The tail is slightly longer than the disc, bearing a single median row of 23-29 thorns and two similar-sized dorsal fins near the end without an interdorsal thorn. The caudal fin is long and tapering, with a filamentous fold on its upper surface. Its teeth number 34 in the upper jaw and 23 in the lower. This species is a uniform pale to salty gray above and below, with dusky outer disc margins.

The Pacific white skate feeds on benthic fishes. Like other skates they are oviparous; the egg cases are olive green in color and longitudinally striated, with horn-like projections on the shell. The size at birth is about 25 cm; and adult females can grow up to 2 meters (6.5 feet). They are of no commercial interest but are occasionally taken as by-catch.

Nurseries have been discovered by warm waters of volcanic areas, suggesting that it is likely the warm waters speed up the gestation period of the eggs, resulting in more successful juveniles.

== Discoveries ==
Reports of it from the Sea of Okhotsk may represent a different species. Its species name, spinosissima, comes from the Latin spinosus meaning "thorny", referring to its covering of dermal denticles.

In 2018, scientists found numerous bag-shaped eggs in proximity to hydrothermal vents near the Galapágos Islands. This finding implied that mother skates were utilizing the volcanic warmth for the incubation of their eggs.

In 2023, a team of scientists that set off to analyze what they thought was an extinct volcano in the Pacific coast of Canada, discovered not only that the volcano was still active but also discovered that the area was covered by hundreds of thousands of Pacific white skate eggs. The newly discovered nursery was much larger than that of Galapágos Islands. The discovered eggs were big, measuring around half a metre (1.5 feet) across.
