= Butterfly skate =

Butterfly skate can refer to any of three species of skate:

- Bathyraja papilionifera, a species of skate found in the Southwest Atlantic.
- Leucoraja naevus, a species of skate, also known as the Cuckoo ray, found in the Eastern Atlantic.
- Bathyraja mariposa, a species of skate found off the coast of Alaska, especially the Aleutian Islands.
