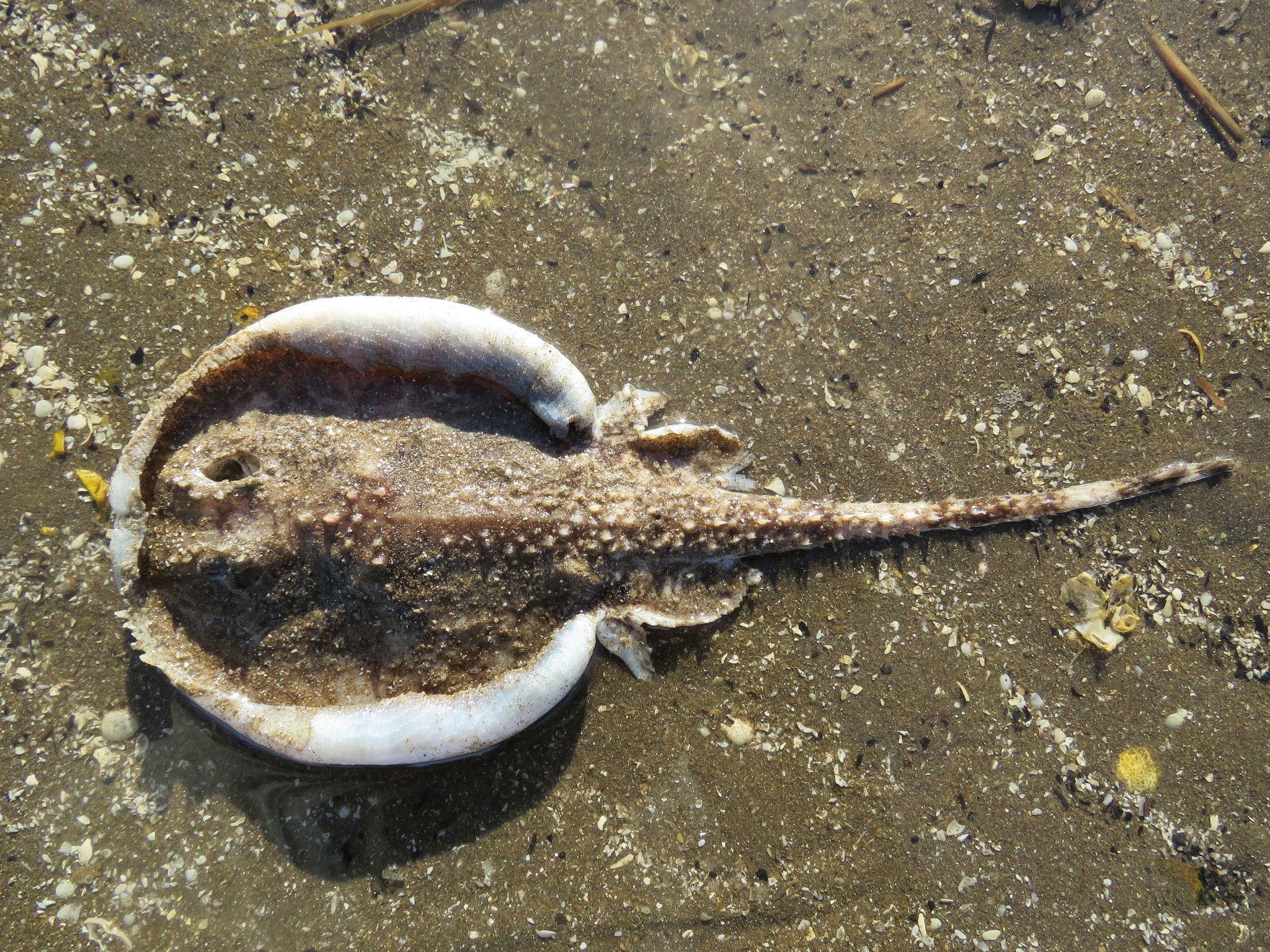

Conservation status
- Least Concern (IUCN 3.1)

Scientific classification
- Kingdom: Animalia
- Phylum: Chordata
- Class: Chondrichthyes
- Subclass: Elasmobranchii
- Order: Rajiformes
- Family: Arhynchobatidae
- Genus: Psammobatis
- Species: P. bergi

Binomial name
- Psammobatis bergi Marini, 1932

= Blotched sandskate =

Species of fish

The blotched sandskate (Psammobatis bergi) is a species of fish in the family Arhynchobatidae. It is found off the coasts of Argentina, Brazil, and Uruguay. Its natural habitat is open seas.
