= Insentiraja laxipella =

Conservation status
- Data Deficient (IUCN 3.1)

Scientific classification
- Kingdom: Animalia
- Phylum: Chordata
- Class: Chondrichthyes
- Subclass: Elasmobranchii
- Order: Rajiformes
- Family: Arhynchobatidae
- Genus: Insentiraja
- Species: I. laxipella

Binomial name
- Insentiraja laxipella (Yearsley & Last, 1992)

Species of cartilaginous fish

Insentiraja laxipella, commonly known as the eastern looseskin skate, is a small deep-water skate in the family Arhynchobatidae. Its known range includes only the continental slope off Queensland.

Due to the limited knowledge of its biology and extent of capture in fisheries, this species is assessed as Data Deficient.
