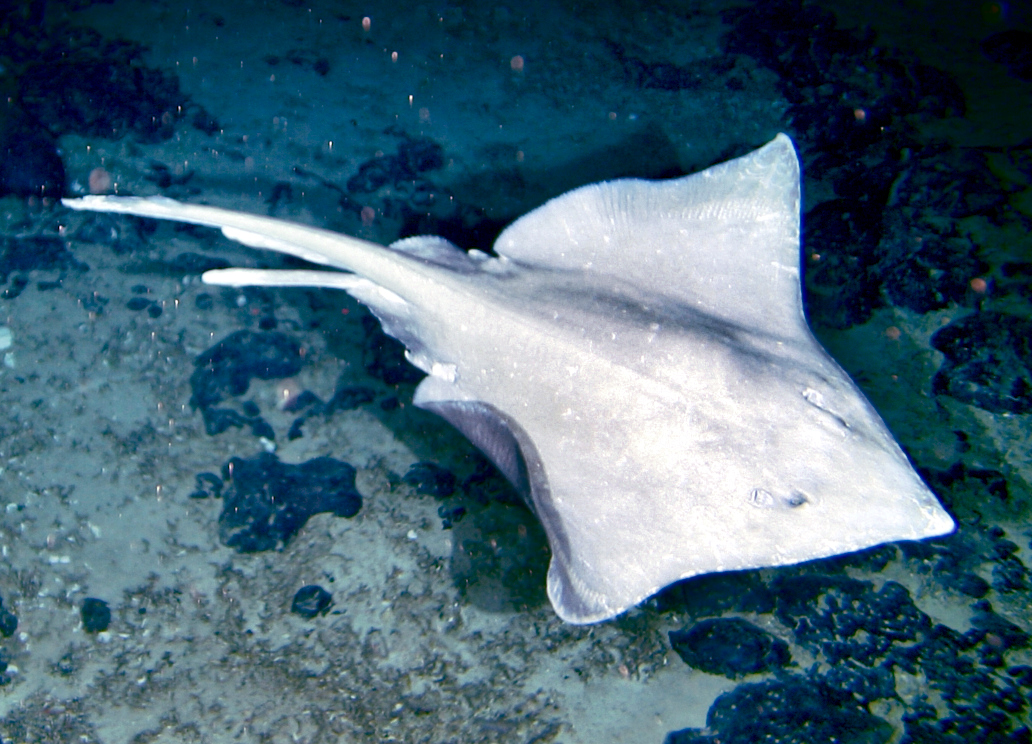

Scientific classification
- Kingdom: Animalia
- Phylum: Chordata
- Class: Chondrichthyes
- Subclass: Elasmobranchii
- Order: Rajiformes
- Family: Arhynchobatidae
- Genus: Bathyraja
- Species: B. richardsoni

Binomial name
- Bathyraja richardsoni (Garrick, 1961)

= Richardson's ray =

Species of cartilaginous fish

Richardson's ray (Bathyraja richardsoni) is a skate of the family Arhynchobatidae, found in the Atlantic Ocean and around Cook Strait in New Zealand, at depths of from 1,300 to 2,500 m. Their length can reach 1.75 m. Dorsal and ventral surfaces of the disc are uniformly covered with dermal denticles, but lack thorns on the disc. The tail has 18 moderately sized thorns.

== Conservation status ==
The New Zealand Department of Conservation has classified the Richardson's ray as being "Not Threatened" but with the qualifier "Data Poor" under the New Zealand Threat Classification System.
