= Dark-belly skate =

Scientific classification
- Kingdom: Animalia
- Phylum: Chordata
- Class: Chondrichthyes
- Subclass: Elasmobranchii
- Order: Rajiformes
- Family: Arhynchobatidae
- Genus: Bathyraja
- Species: B. meridionalis

Binomial name
- Bathyraja meridionalis Stehmann, 1987

Species of fish

The dark-belly skate (Bathyraja meridionalis), is a species of skate from the western South Atlantic Ocean (Argentina and Uruguay). It is an oviparous species; females lay eggs enclosed in a horny capsule. Male specimens can reach 120 cm.

== Description ==
Bathyraja meridionalis is a large deep-water skate, exceeding 1 m in total length. It has a short, blunt snout and is dark brown on both its dorsal and ventral surfaces. The upper surface of the disc is covered with coarse denticles, while the underside is smooth. A continuous row of more than 30 thorns extends from the nape to the first dorsal fin.

== Distribution and habitat ==
The species was described from the eastern continental slope of South Georgia, where the two type specimens were collected at approximately 800 m depth. Bottom-water temperatures at the type localities were around 1.9–2 °C. Stehmann considered it a deep-water species with a likely southern Atlantic or broader Southern Hemisphere distribution.

== Etymology ==
The specific epithet meridionalis is derived from the Latin meridianus, meaning “southerly”, referring to the type localities being, at the time of its description, the southernmost records of a deep-water species of the genus Bathyraja.
