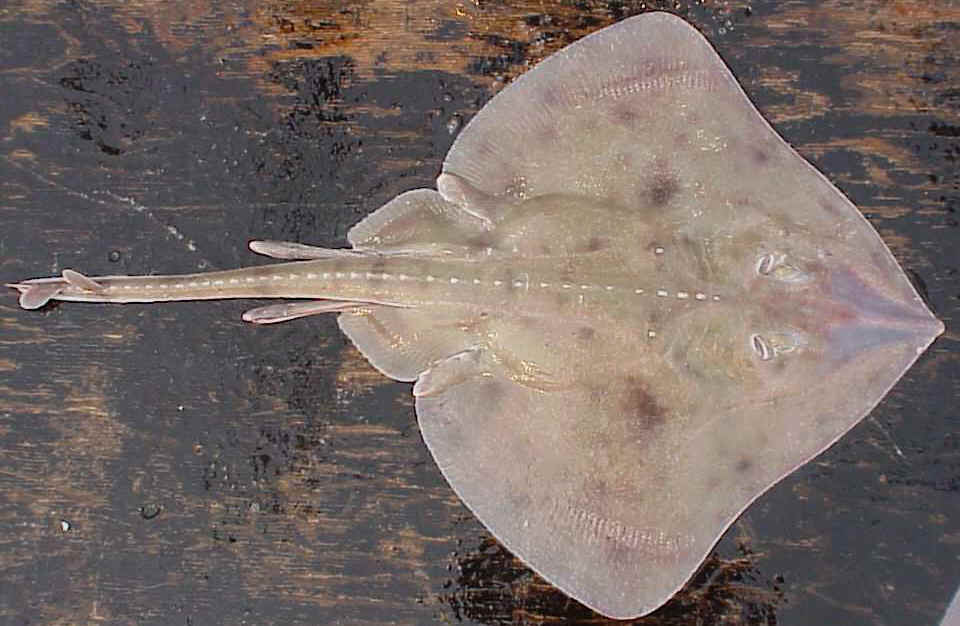

Conservation status
- Least Concern (IUCN 3.1)

Scientific classification
- Kingdom: Animalia
- Phylum: Chordata
- Class: Chondrichthyes
- Subclass: Elasmobranchii
- Order: Rajiformes
- Family: Arhynchobatidae
- Genus: Bathyraja
- Species: B. aleutica

Binomial name
- Bathyraja aleutica (C. H. Gilbert, 1896)

= Aleutian skate =

Species of cartilaginous fish

The Aleutian skate (Bathyraja aleutica) is a species of skate in the family Arhynchobatidae. It lives in depths ranging from 15 to 1602 meters in North Pacific Ocean from northern parts of Japan to the Aleutian Islands and southeastern Alaska and south to northern California. It has a maximum total length of 161 centimeters. It is the most abundant species of the Bathyraja genus in the eastern Bering Sea slope and throughout the Gulf of Alaska.

It is oviparous and produces oblong egg capsules with stiff horn in each corner. The embryo gets its nutrients from the yolk which is at first utilized for growth at a relatively constant rate but later in the development the yolk is absorbed rapidly.
