= Shortfin sandskate =

Conservation status
- Least Concern (IUCN 3.1)

Scientific classification
- Kingdom: Animalia
- Phylum: Chordata
- Class: Chondrichthyes
- Subclass: Elasmobranchii
- Order: Rajiformes
- Family: Arhynchobatidae
- Genus: Psammobatis
- Species: P. normani

Binomial name
- Psammobatis normani McEachran, 1983

Species of fish

The shortfin sandskate (Psammobatis normani) is a species of fish in the family Arhynchobatidae. It is found off the shores of Argentina and Chile. Its natural habitat is open seas.
