= Bathyraja tzinovskii =

Creamback skate

Conservation status
- Least Concern (IUCN 3.1)

Scientific classification
- Kingdom: Animalia
- Phylum: Chordata
- Class: Chondrichthyes
- Subclass: Elasmobranchii
- Order: Rajiformes
- Family: Arhynchobatidae
- Genus: Bathyraja
- Species: B. tzinovskii

Binomial name
- Bathyraja tzinovskii Dolganov, 1983

Species of fish

Bathyraja tzinovskii, the creamback skate, is a species of skate in the family Arhynchobatidae found in the western Pacific Ocean.

== Size ==
This species reaches a length of 69.0 cm (27.2 in).

== Etymology ==
The fish is named in honor of oceanographer Vladimir Diodorovich Tzinovskiy of the P. P. Shirshov Institute of Oceanology in Moscow, who collected the holotype specimen.
