= Smallthorn sandskate =

Conservation status
- Least Concern (IUCN 3.1)

Scientific classification
- Kingdom: Animalia
- Phylum: Chordata
- Class: Chondrichthyes
- Subclass: Elasmobranchii
- Order: Rajiformes
- Family: Arhynchobatidae
- Genus: Psammobatis
- Species: P. rudis

Binomial name
- Psammobatis rudis Günther, 1870

Species of fish

The smallthorn sandskate (Psammobatis rudis) is a species of fish in the family Arhynchobatidae. It is found off the coasts of Argentina and Chile. Its natural habitat is open seas.
