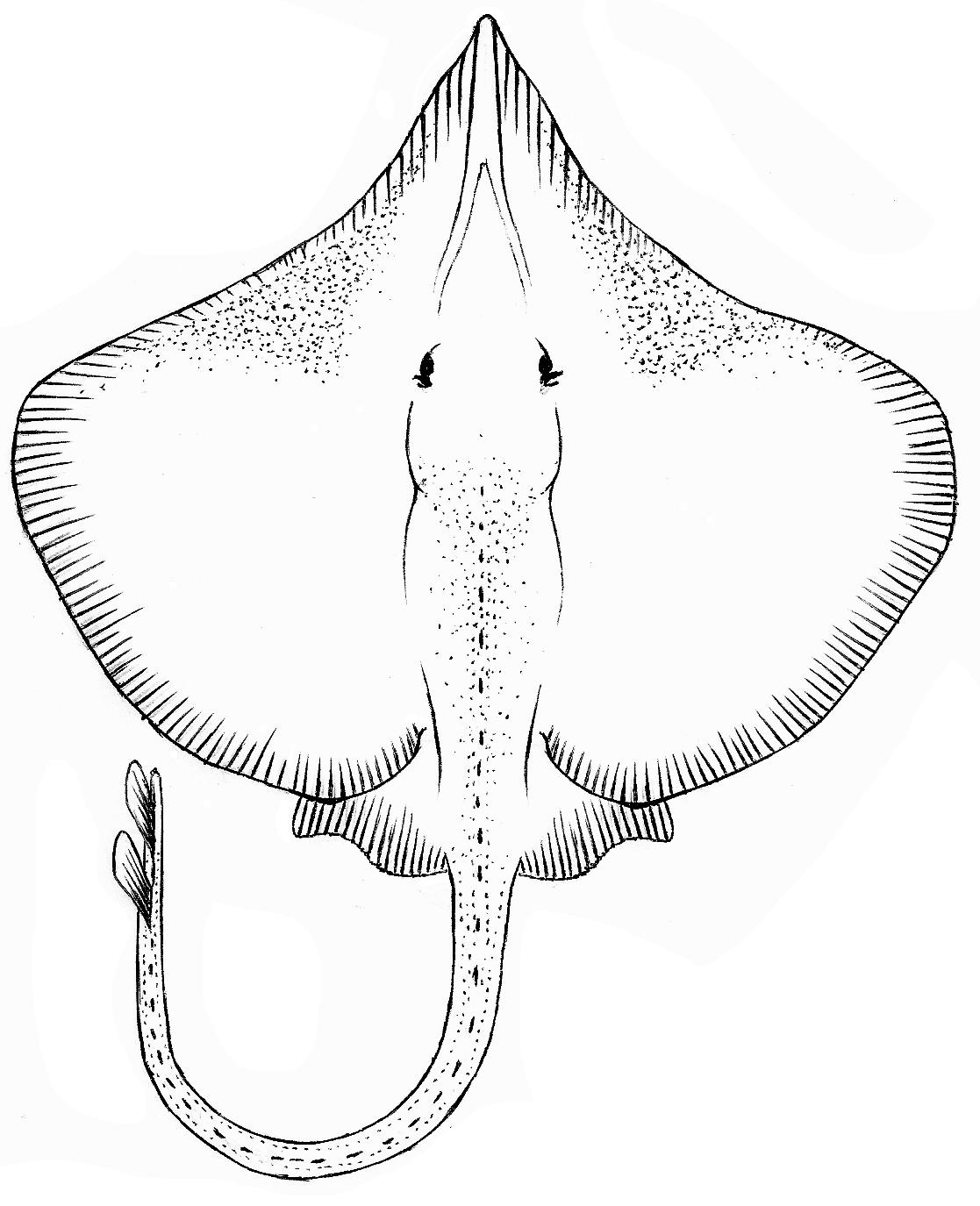

Conservation status
- Critically Endangered (IUCN 3.1)

Scientific classification
- Kingdom: Animalia
- Phylum: Chordata
- Class: Chondrichthyes
- Subclass: Elasmobranchii
- Order: Rajiformes
- Family: Arhynchobatidae
- Genus: Sympterygia
- Species: S. acuta

Binomial name
- Sympterygia acuta Garman, 1877

= Bignose fanskate =

Species of fish

The bignose fanskate (Sympterygia acuta) is a species of fish in the family Arhynchobatidae. It is found off Argentina, Brazil, and Uruguay. Its natural habitats are open seas and shallow seas.
