= Bathyraja taranetzi =

Mud skate

Conservation status
- Least Concern (IUCN 3.1)

Scientific classification
- Kingdom: Animalia
- Phylum: Chordata
- Class: Chondrichthyes
- Subclass: Elasmobranchii
- Order: Rajiformes
- Family: Arhynchobatidae
- Genus: Bathyraja
- Species: B. taranetzi

Binomial name
- Bathyraja taranetzi (Dolganov, 1983)

Synonyms
- Rhinoraja taranetzi Dolganov, 1983

Species of fish

Bathyraja taranetzi, the mud skate, is a species of skate in the family Arhynchobatidae found in the north-western Pacific Ocean.

== Size ==
This species reaches a length of 70.0 cm (27.6 in).

== Etymology ==
The fish is named in honor of Anatoly Yakovlevich Taranetz (1910–1941), an expert on fishes of the far-eastern seas of the U.S.S.R..
