= Slimtail skate =

Conservation status
- Least Concern (IUCN 3.1)

Scientific classification
- Kingdom: Animalia
- Phylum: Chordata
- Class: Chondrichthyes
- Subclass: Elasmobranchii
- Order: Rajiformes
- Family: Arhynchobatidae
- Genus: Bathyraja
- Species: B. longicauda

Binomial name
- Bathyraja longicauda (F. de Buen, 1959)

Species of fish

The slimtail skate (Bathyraja longicauda) is a species of fish in the family Arhynchobatidae. It is found in Chile and Peru in its natural habitat of open seas.
