= Bathyraja matsubarai =

Dusky-purple skate

Conservation status
- Least Concern (IUCN 3.1)

Scientific classification
- Kingdom: Animalia
- Phylum: Chordata
- Class: Chondrichthyes
- Subclass: Elasmobranchii
- Order: Rajiformes
- Family: Arhynchobatidae
- Genus: Bathyraja
- Species: B. matsubarai

Binomial name
- Bathyraja matsubarai (Ishiyama, 1952)

Synonyms
- Breviraja matsubarai Ishiyama, 1952

Species of fish

Bathyraja matsubarai, the dusky-purple skate, is a species of skate in the family Arhynchobatidae found in the north-western Pacific Ocean.

== Size ==
This species reaches a length of 126.0 cm (49.6 in).

== Etymology ==
The fish is named in honor of ichthyologist Kiyomatsu Matsubara (1907–1968), of the Imperial Fisheries Institute in Tokyo, who collected one of the paratypes at a fish market.
