= Zipper sandskate =

Conservation status
- Least Concern (IUCN 3.1)

Scientific classification
- Kingdom: Animalia
- Phylum: Chordata
- Class: Chondrichthyes
- Subclass: Elasmobranchii
- Order: Rajiformes
- Family: Arhynchobatidae
- Genus: Psammobatis
- Species: P. extenta

Binomial name
- Psammobatis extenta (Garman, 1913)

Species of fish

The zipper sandskate (Psammobatis extenta) is a species of fish in the family Arhynchobatidae. It is found in the Atlantic Ocean off the coasts of Argentina, Brazil, and Uruguay. Its natural habitat is open seas. Their diet consists of Crustaceans and other small creatures. The distributions of their prey changes with the seasons, whatever is available at the time is what they feed on (Muto et al. 2001).
