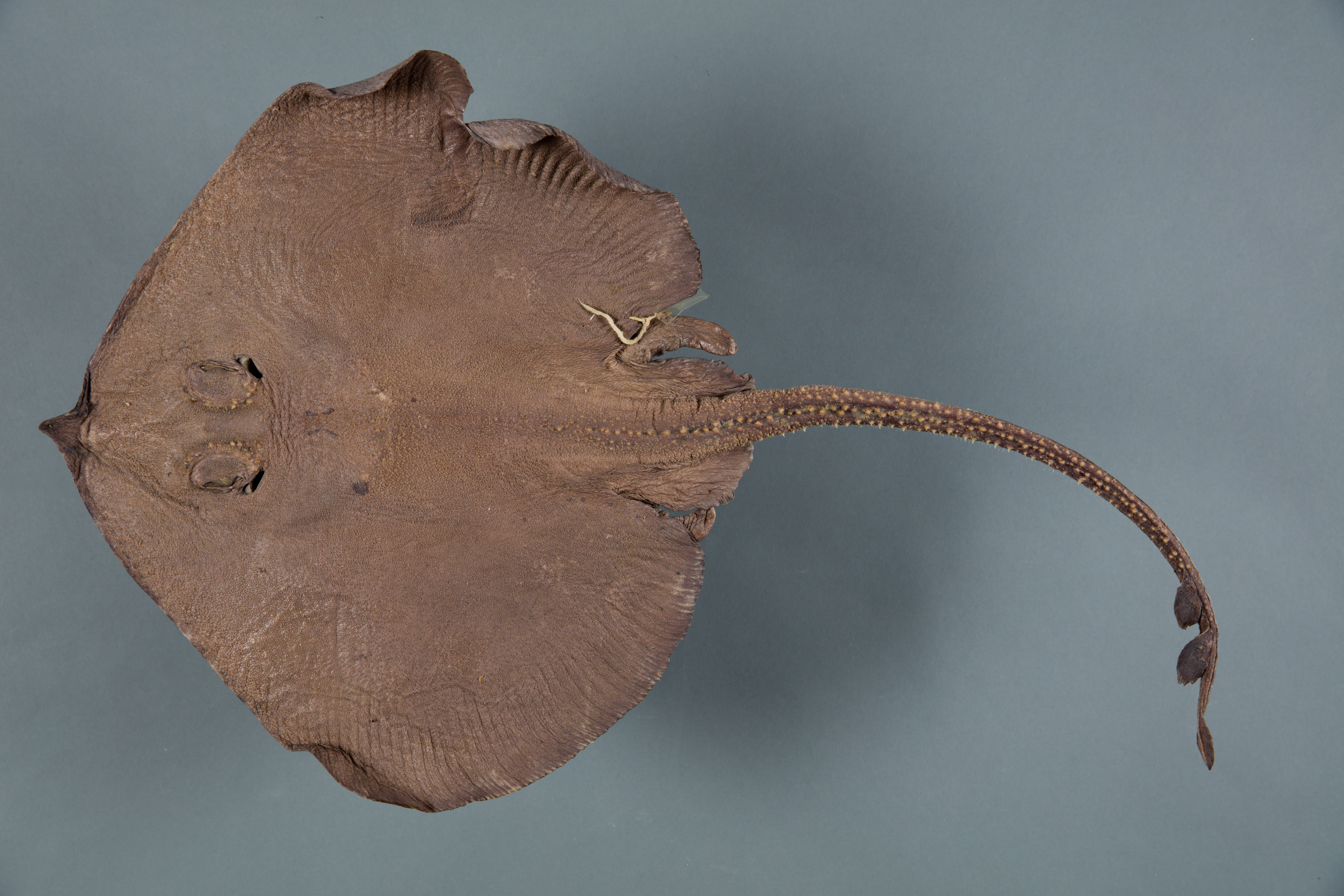
- Specimen from the Auckland War Memorial Museum collections

Conservation status
- Data Deficient (IUCN 3.1)

Scientific classification
- Kingdom: Animalia
- Phylum: Chordata
- Class: Chondrichthyes
- Subclass: Elasmobranchii
- Order: Rajiformes
- Family: Arhynchobatidae
- Genus: Brochiraja
- Species: B. asperula

Binomial name
- Brochiraja asperula (Garrick & Paul, 1974)

Synonyms
- Bathyraja asperula Garrick & Paul, 1974; Notoraja asperula (Garrick & Paul, 1974); Pavoraja asperula (Garrick & Paul, 1974)

= Smooth deep-sea skate =

Species of cartilaginous fish

The smooth deep-sea skate (Brochiraja asperula) is a skate in the family Arhynchobatidae. It is found off New Zealand, at depths of from 200 to 1,300 m (660 to 4,270 ft) on the continental shelf. Their length is from 30 to 50 cm (12 to 20 in).

== Conservation status ==
The IUCN has classified the smooth deep-sea skate as "Data deficient". The New Zealand Department of Conservation follows this classification under the New Zealand Threat Classification System.

== Gallery ==
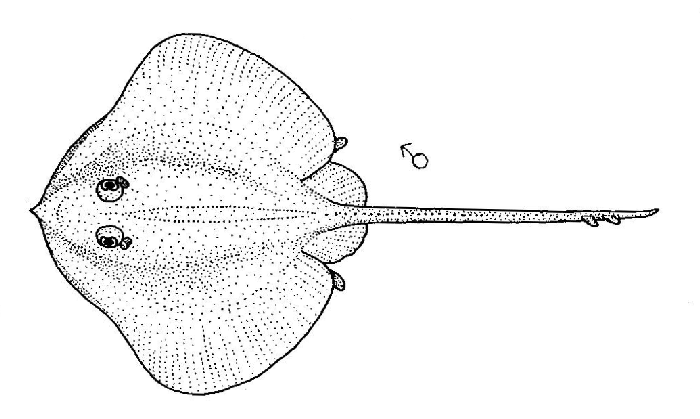
Drawing by Dr Tony Ayling

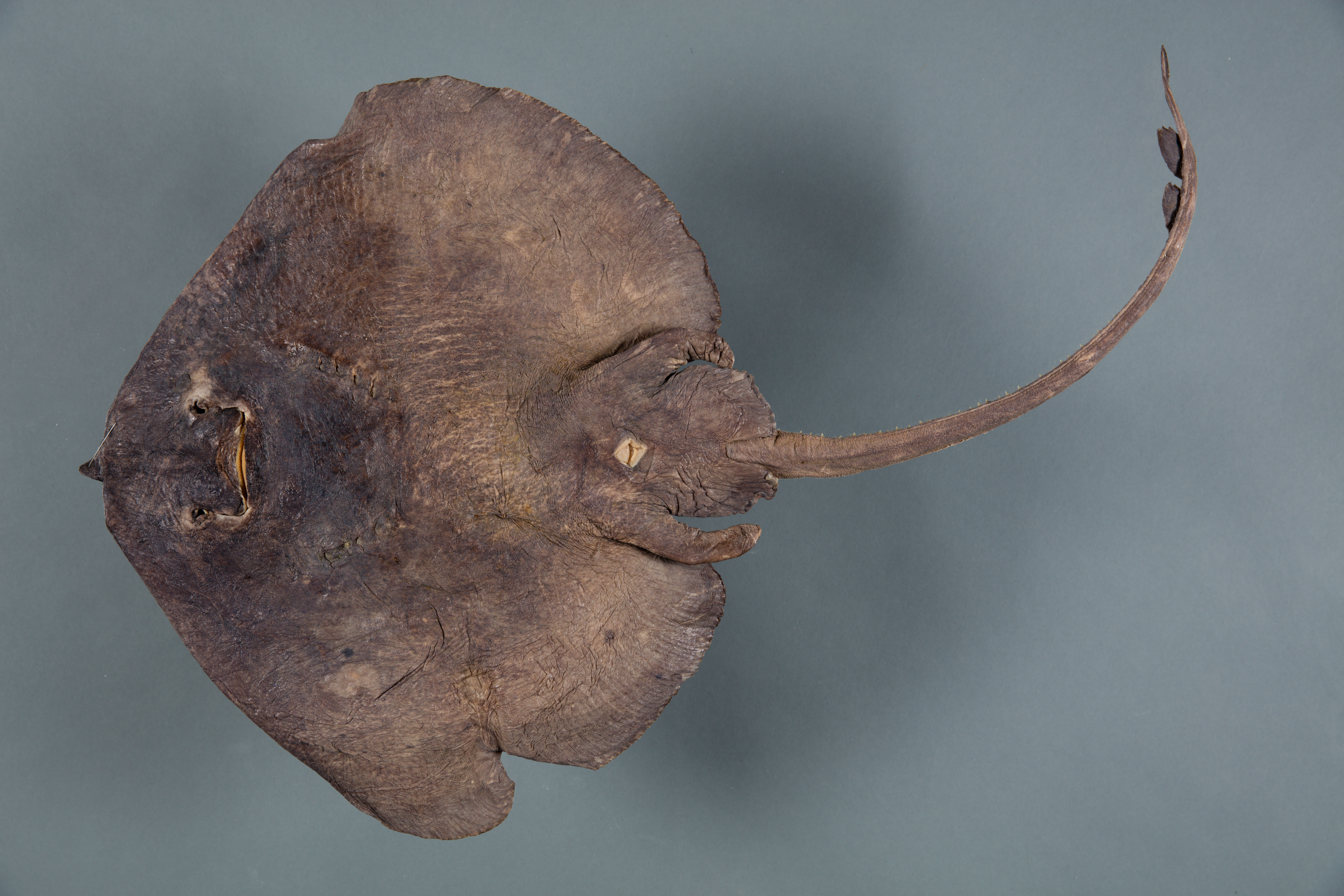
Underside of the smooth deep-sea skate
