= Bathyraja cousseauae =

Conservation status
- Least Concern (IUCN 3.1)

Scientific classification
- Kingdom: Animalia
- Phylum: Chordata
- Class: Chondrichthyes
- Subclass: Elasmobranchii
- Order: Rajiformes
- Family: Arhynchobatidae
- Genus: Bathyraja
- Species: B. cousseauae

Binomial name
- Bathyraja cousseauae Díaz de Astarloa & Mabragaña, 2004

Species of cartilaginous fish

Bathyraja cousseauae, also known as Cousseau's skate or the joined-fins skate, is a species of skate within the genus Bathyraja. The species is found in the Southwest Atlantic Ocean.

== Size ==
This species reaches a length of 86 cm (34 in).

== Etymology ==
The species is named after Maria Berta Cousseau, a marine biologist who contributed to the understanding of marine fish in Argentina.
