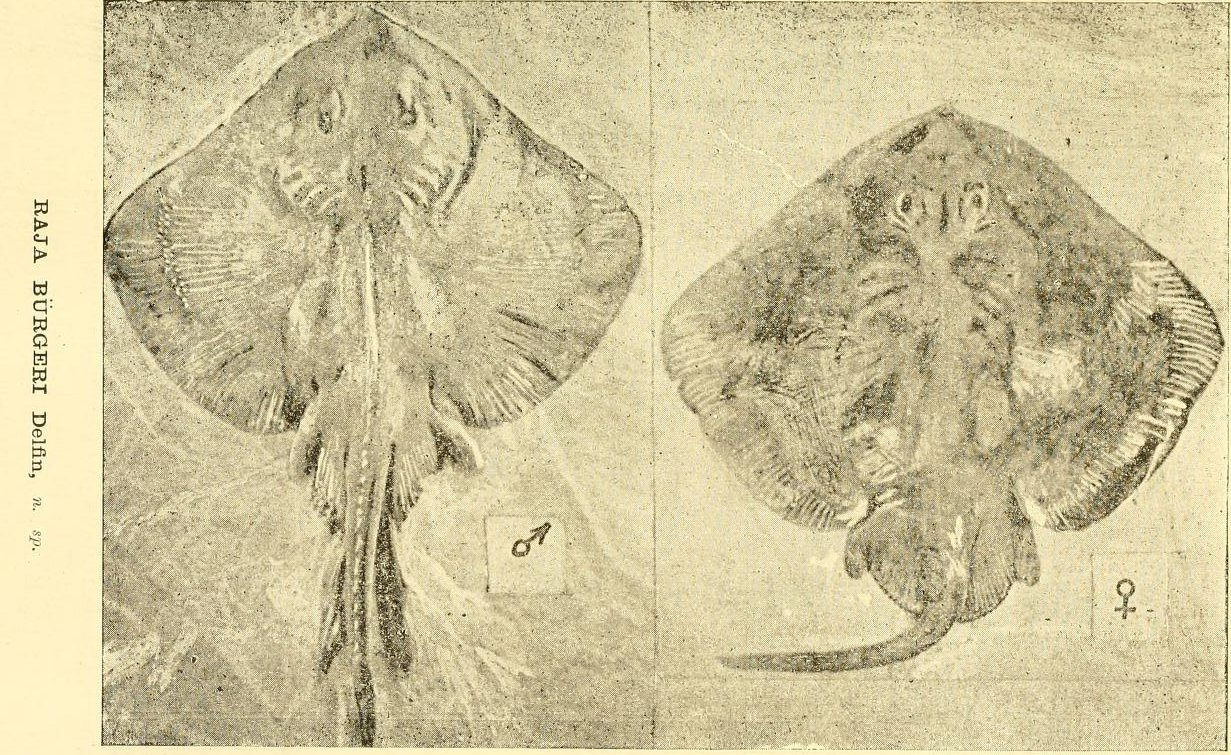

Conservation status
- Least Concern (IUCN 3.1)

Scientific classification
- Kingdom: Animalia
- Phylum: Chordata
- Class: Chondrichthyes
- Subclass: Elasmobranchii
- Order: Rajiformes
- Family: Arhynchobatidae
- Genus: Sympterygia
- Species: S. lima

Binomial name
- Sympterygia lima (Poeppig, 1835)

= Filetail fanskate =

Species of fish

The filetail fanskate (Sympterygia lima) is a species of fish in the family Arhynchobatidae. It is endemic to the Pacific coast of Chile. Its natural habitat is open seas.
