= Bathyraja maculata =

Scientific classification
- Domain: Eukaryota
- Kingdom: Animalia
- Phylum: Chordata
- Class: Chondrichthyes
- Subclass: Elasmobranchii
- Order: Rajiformes
- Family: Arhynchobatidae
- Genus: Bathyraja
- Species: B. maculata

Binomial name
- Bathyraja maculata Ishiyama & Ishihara, 1977

Species of fish

Bathyraja maculata, the white-blotched skate, is a species of skate from the western North Pacific Ocean. An adult is approximately 1 meter in length, and is found at depths of up to 1 kilometer. Unlike any other known member of the genus Bathyraja, the white-blotched skate has white blotches on a grey to brown dorsal surface, while the ventral side is lighter in color with darker blotches. Dorsal side is rough with spines, while the ventral side is smooth.

== Range ==
The white-blotched skate is well established to inhabit waters in the Northern Sea of Japan, Sea of Okhotsk and Aleutian Islands. It was the most commonly caught skate in a NOAA bottom-trawl survey of the Aleutian Islands in 2006. Initially thought to inhabit only the western margin of the Gulf of Alaska, trawl surveys have now found specimens along the eastern margin as well.
