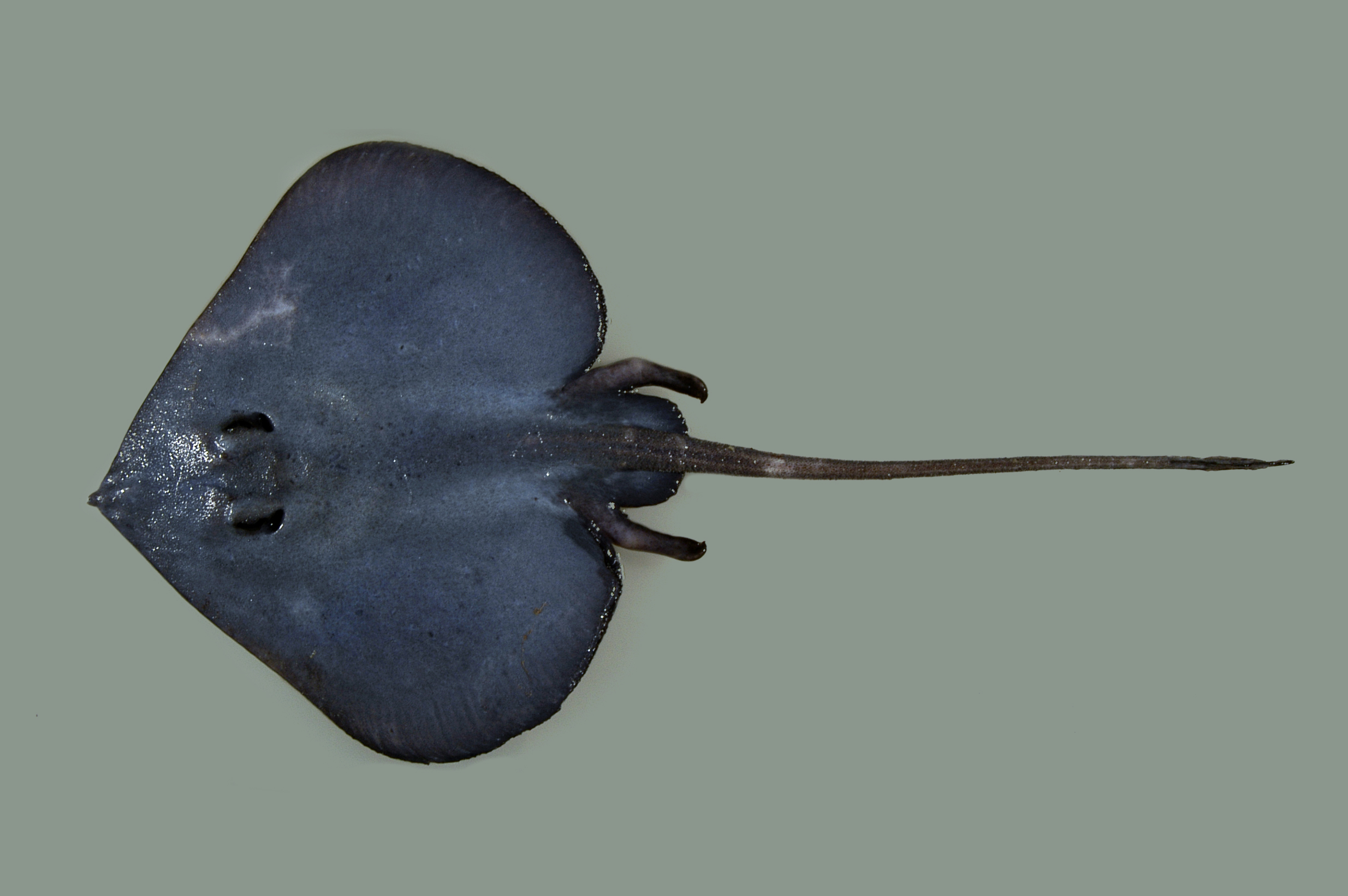

Conservation status
- Least Concern (IUCN 3.1)

Scientific classification
- Kingdom: Animalia
- Phylum: Chordata
- Class: Chondrichthyes
- Subclass: Elasmobranchii
- Order: Rajiformes
- Family: Arhynchobatidae
- Genus: Insentiraja
- Species: I. subtilispinosa

Binomial name
- Insentiraja subtilispinosa (Stehmann, 1989)

= Insentiraja subtilispinosa =

Species of cartilaginous fish

Insentiraja subtilispinosa, commonly known as the western looseskin skate or velvet skate, is a common deep water skate in the family Arhynchobatidae. Based on reported bycatch rates and population observances, there is no evidence to support concern of the western looseskin skate.

== Distribution and habitat ==
The western looseskin skate is typically found at depths between 320 and 1,460 meters (1,050 and 4,790 ft) off northwest Australia, Indonesia, and the Philippines. Although it is abundant in its known range, little is known about its biology.
