= Bathyraja maccaini =

Conservation status
- Least Concern (IUCN 3.1)

Scientific classification
- Kingdom: Animalia
- Phylum: Chordata
- Class: Chondrichthyes
- Subclass: Elasmobranchii
- Order: Rajiformes
- Family: Arhynchobatidae
- Genus: Bathyraja
- Species: B. maccaini

Binomial name
- Bathyraja maccaini Springer, 1971

Species of cartilaginous fish

Bathyraja maccaini, also known as McCain's skate, is a species of softnose skate in the family Arhynchobatidae. It is a demersal species. Its range is poorly understood, but it is distributed in Antarctic and Subantarctic waters from the Orkney and South Shetland Islands to the Antarctic Peninsula. Its distribution may also extend into the Weddell and Ross Seas. It is typically found at depths between 91 and 500 metres.

It is currently listed by the IUCN as being least concern.

Like other elasmobranchs, McCain's skate is oviparous and lay eggs in mermaid's purses. The embryos are dependent on yolk, and as such do not feed in early development. Young individuals may follow large objects, such as their mothers.

McCain's skate is slow-growing, reaching its full size of 120 centimetres after 10 years or more.

It is sometimes caught incidentally by fisheries that target Dissostichus eleginodes in the Ross Sea.

Named in honor of Antarctic zoologist John C. McCain, collector of the type, aboard the M/V Hero in 1967.
