= Bathyraja fedorovi =

Cinnamon skate

Conservation status
- Least Concern (IUCN 3.1)

Scientific classification
- Kingdom: Animalia
- Phylum: Chordata
- Class: Chondrichthyes
- Subclass: Elasmobranchii
- Order: Rajiformes
- Family: Arhynchobatidae
- Genus: Bathyraja
- Species: B. fedorovi

Binomial name
- Bathyraja fedorovi Dolganov, 1983

Species of fish

Bathyraja fedorovi, the cinnamon skate, is a species of skate in the family Arhynchobatidae found in the north-western Pacific Ocean.

== Size ==
This species reaches a length of 73.3 cm (28.9 in).

== Etymology ==
The fish is named in honor of Soviet ichthyologist Vladimir Vladimirovich Fedorov (1939–2011), who collected the holotype specimen.
