= Bathyraja diplotaenia =

Dusky-pink skate

Conservation status
- Least Concern (IUCN 3.1)

Scientific classification
- Kingdom: Animalia
- Phylum: Chordata
- Class: Chondrichthyes
- Subclass: Elasmobranchii
- Order: Rajiformes
- Family: Arhynchobatidae
- Genus: Bathyraja
- Species: B. diplotaenia

Binomial name
- Bathyraja diplotaenia (Ishiyama, 1952)

Synonyms
- Breviraja diplotaenia Ishiyama, 1952

Species of fish

Bathyraja diplotaenia, the dusky-pink skate, is a species of skate in the family Arhynchobatidae found in the north-western Pacific Ocean.
