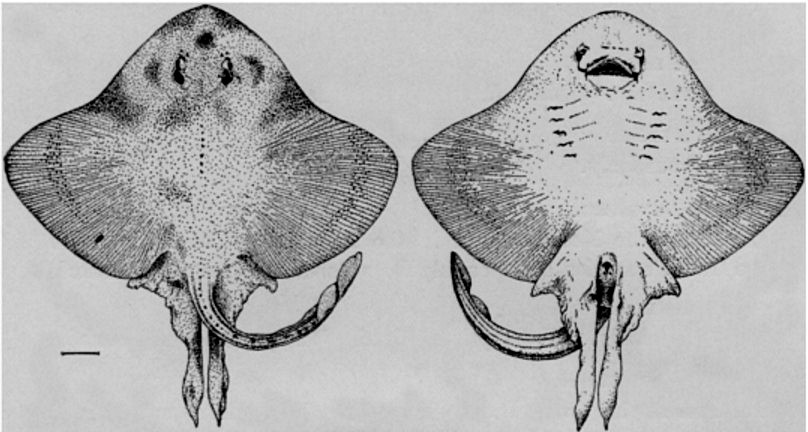

Conservation status
- Near Threatened (IUCN 3.1)

Scientific classification
- Kingdom: Animalia
- Phylum: Chordata
- Class: Chondrichthyes
- Subclass: Elasmobranchii
- Order: Rajiformes
- Family: Arhynchobatidae
- Genus: Sympterygia
- Species: S. brevicaudata

Binomial name
- Sympterygia brevicaudata (Cope, 1877)

= Shorttail fanskate =

Species of fish

The shorttail fanskate (Sympterygia brevicaudata) is a species of fish in the family Arhynchobatidae. It is found in the western Pacific Ocean off Chile, Ecuador, and Peru. Its natural habitat is shallow seas.
