= Rhinoraja =

Scientific classification
- Kingdom: Animalia
- Phylum: Chordata
- Class: Chondrichthyes
- Subclass: Elasmobranchii
- Order: Rajiformes
- Family: Arhynchobatidae
- Genus: Rhinoraja; Ishiyama, 1952

Genus of cartilaginous fishes

Rhinoraja, commonly known as the jointnose skates, is a genus of skates in the family Arhynchobatidae. They are found in the north-western Pacific Ocean.

== Species ==
Currently, the genus consists of three recognized species. Other species formerly placed here have been moved to the genus Bathyraja.

- Rhinoraja kujiensis (S. Tanaka (I), 1916) (Dapple-bellied softnose skate)
- Rhinoraja longicauda Ishiyama, 1952 (White-bellied softnose skate)
- Rhinoraja odai Ishiyama, 1958 (Oda's skate)
