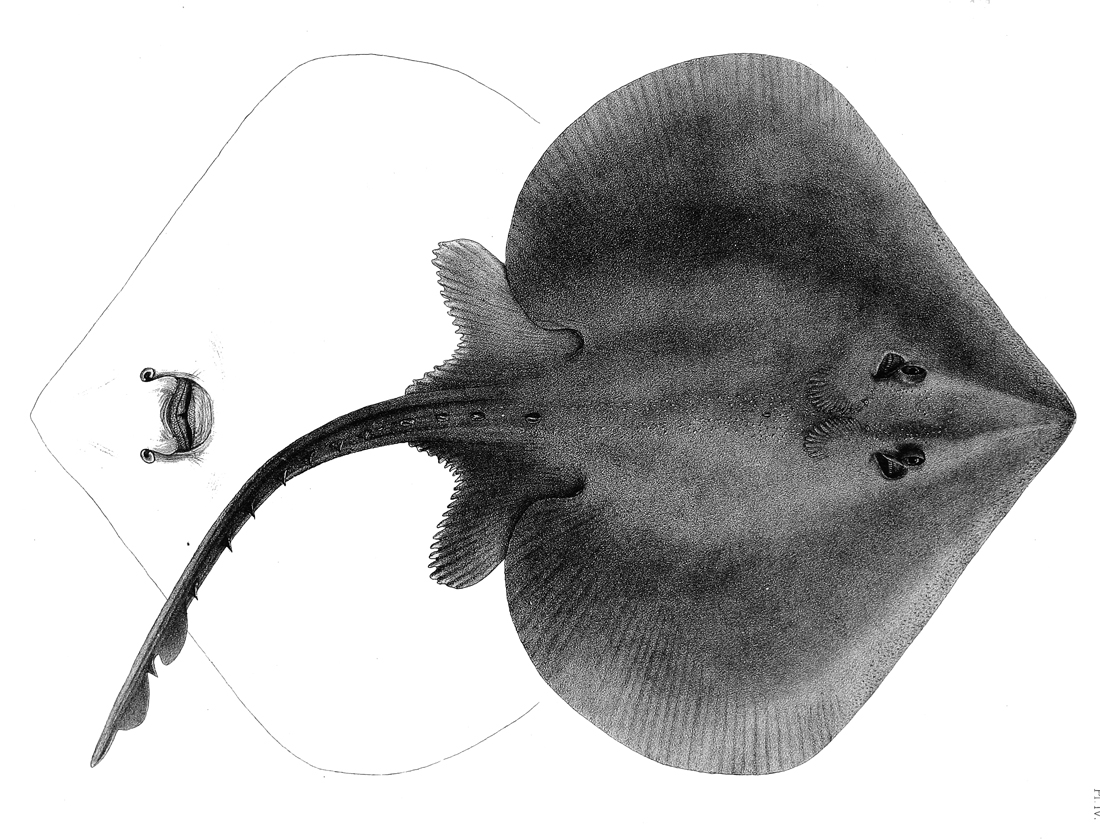

Conservation status
- Near Threatened (IUCN 3.1)

Scientific classification
- Kingdom: Animalia
- Phylum: Chordata
- Class: Chondrichthyes
- Subclass: Elasmobranchii
- Order: Rajiformes
- Family: Arhynchobatidae
- Genus: Sympterygia
- Species: S. bonapartii

Binomial name
- Sympterygia bonapartii J. P. Müller & Henle, 1841

Synonyms
- Sympterygia bonapartei Müller & Henle, 1841

= Smallnose fanskate =

Species of fish

The smallnose fanskate (Sympterygia bonapartii) is a species of fish in the family Arhynchobatidae. It is found off the coasts of Argentina, Brazil, Chile, and Uruguay. Its natural habitats are open seas, shallow seas, and estuarine waters.
