= Psammobatis parvacauda =

Conservation status
- Data Deficient (IUCN 3.1)

Scientific classification
- Kingdom: Animalia
- Phylum: Chordata
- Class: Chondrichthyes
- Subclass: Elasmobranchii
- Order: Rajiformes
- Family: Arhynchobatidae
- Genus: Psammobatis
- Species: P. parvacauda

Binomial name
- Psammobatis parvacauda (McEachran, 1983)

Species of cartilaginous fish

Psammobatis parvacauda, commonly known as the smalltail sandskate, is a skate in the family Arhynchobatidae. Based on the single known specimen, its range includes at least the area northeast of the Falkland Islands.

Due to the limited knowledge of its biology and extent of capture in fisheries, this species is assessed as Data Deficient.
