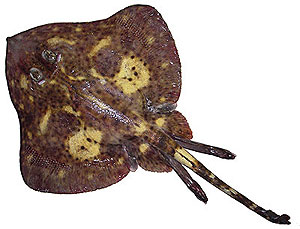

Conservation status
- Least Concern (IUCN 3.1)

Scientific classification
- Kingdom: Animalia
- Phylum: Chordata
- Class: Chondrichthyes
- Subclass: Elasmobranchii
- Order: Rajiformes
- Family: Arhynchobatidae
- Genus: Bathyraja
- Species: B. mariposa

Binomial name
- Bathyraja mariposa D. E. Stevenson, J. W. Orr, Hoff & McEachran, 2004

= Bathyraja mariposa =

Species of cartilaginous fish

Bathyraja mariposa, sometimes referred to as the butterfly skate, is a species of skate found in the Aleutian Islands. It is overall a medium-brown color, lacks thorns on the disc and has indistinct thorns on the tail. It was discovered in 2002 during a National Marine Fisheries Service survey, and first described in 2004. The holotype specimen is held at the University of Washington. Its species name "mariposa" derives from the Spanish word for butterfly, although several other species are sometimes referred to as the "butterfly skate."

== Description ==
Bathyraja mariposa is a medium-sized skate relative to other Alaska skates, measuring approximately 0.76 meters total length. It has a lengthy snout and moderately long tail and lacks a pseudosiphon in the claspers. It is morphologically similar to two other Alaskan skates, Bathyraja violacea and Rhinoraja taranetzi, but can be distinguished based on coloration patterns. B. mariposa is green-brown on the dorsal side of the disc, with small dark brown or black blotches on disc and tail. Large yellowish blotches usually appear on the surface of the pectoral fins. The dorsal surface of the disc has uniformly dense coverage of dermal denticles.

== Ecology ==
Bathyraja mariposa has been estimated to have a population density of approximately 0.34 individuals per square kilometer in the Aleutian islands. Trawl surveys have not uncovered this species outside of that region and appears to be found principally in the central Aleutians. It is believed to be benthopelagic, found in waters 90 – 448 meters deep.
