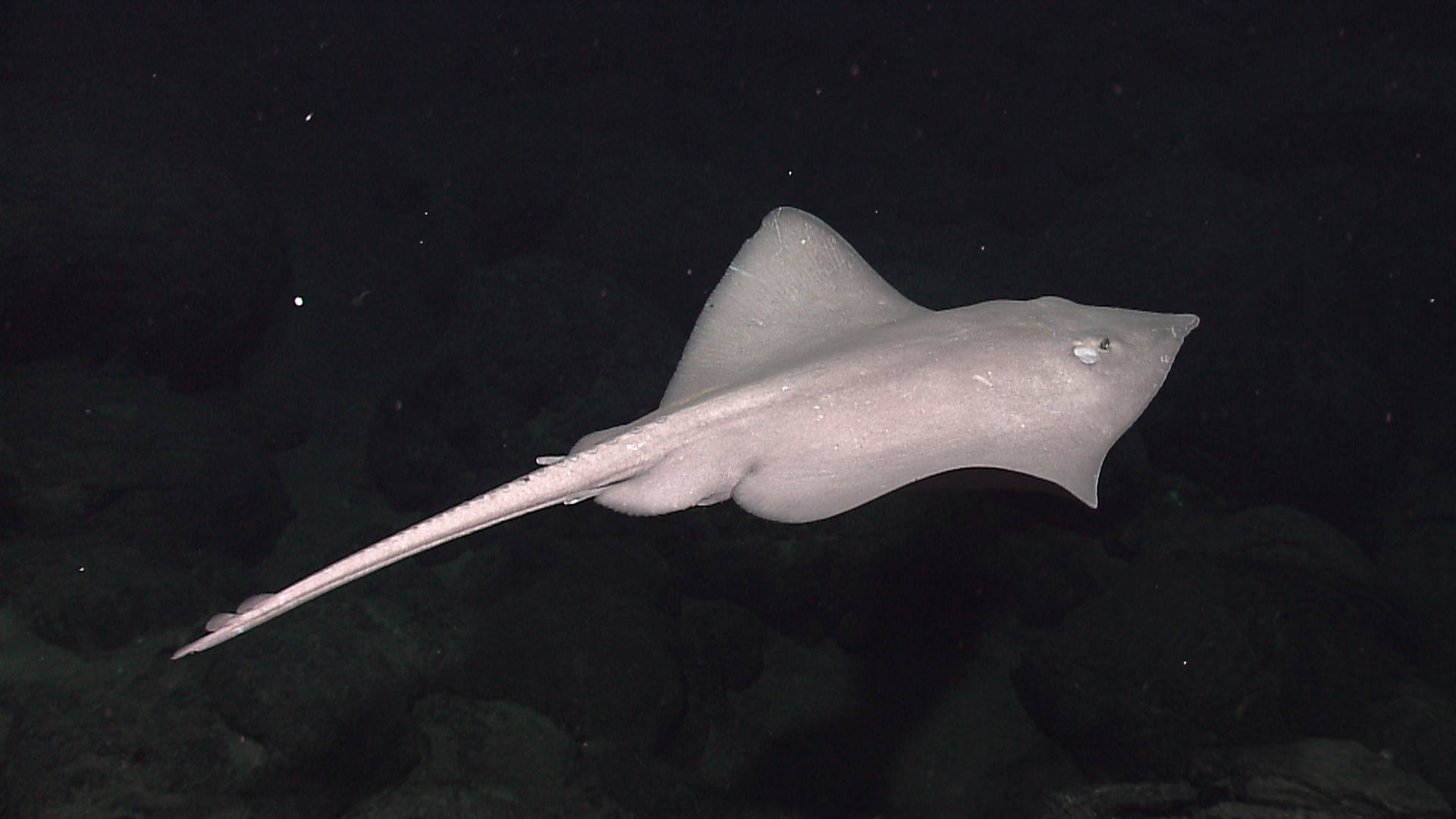

Conservation status
- Least Concern (IUCN 3.1)

Scientific classification
- Kingdom: Animalia
- Phylum: Chordata
- Class: Chondrichthyes
- Subclass: Elasmobranchii
- Order: Rajiformes
- Family: Arhynchobatidae
- Genus: Bathyraja
- Species: B. abyssicola

Binomial name
- Bathyraja abyssicola (C. H. Gilbert, 1896)

Synonyms
- Raja abyssicola Gilbert, 1896

= Deepsea skate =

Species of cartilaginous fish

The deep-sea skate (Bathyraja abyssicola) is a species of soft-nose skate, in the family Arhynchobatidae. The species name abyssicola comes from the Greek abyssos meaning "bottomless", and cola meaning "living at depths". It has a depressed body shape with an inferior mouth located underneath. Under the genus Bathyraja, B. abyssicola is also part of the order Rajiformes and subclass Elasmobranchii. This is a subclass of Chondrichthyes, or cartilaginous fish like other rays, skates, and sharks.

== Description ==
The pectoral fin disc of the deep-sea skate has a moderately triangular anterior margin, a broadly rounded posterior margin, and rounded tips. The disc is slightly wider than it is long. One to five nuchal thorns are placed on the dorsal midline behind the eyes, separated from a continuous row of 21-32 median tail thorns. The tail is moderately long, narrow, and tapering, terminating in a small, low-set caudal fin. The two close-set dorsal fins usually have an interdorsal thorn. Its coloration is grayish purple to dark chocolate brown or black on the upper side of the body, occasionally scattered with small darker spots and slightly darker below, except for a whitish area around the mouth. The anterior tips of the pelvic fins are whitish. Large males have irregular whitish blotches and numerous dark spots, while females have reduced or absent blotches. Juveniles tend to be uniform in color.

== Geographic distribution ==
They are distributed from off northern Baja California around Coronado Island and Cortes Bank, north to the Bering Sea, and west to Japan. There have also been sightings north of Darwin Island within the Galapagos Marine Reserve in 2015. This was the first record of B. abyssicola being found in the tropical eastern Pacific Ocean. It is fairly common below 1,000 m, and is taken as bycatch in deep-water trawls and traps.

From 2000 to 2017, the Monterey Bay Aquarium Research Institute (MBARI) have recorded many in situ observation of skates using remotely operated and autonomous underwater vehicles (ROVs and AUVs) and other underwater imaging methods. These observations were then plotted on a map showing the northeastern Pacific to show the depth and range of the different species.

Alongside with species Bathyraja trachura and Amblyraja hyperborea, the deep-sea skate has been noted to be found in wide depths greater than 2200 meters (600-2876 meters). Data also showed that while there was no preference for depth range, there were many observations of the deep-sea skate being found in habitats with colder temperatures and a varied range of oxygen levels. Habitats are typically flat and sediment-based but can also include areas near canyon walls with rock-out crops, mixed and hard substrate, lava, and chemosynthetic materials. Based on MBARI's observations, many were found along medium to steep mud and rock slopes with its front facing up the slope. However, they are not commonly seen at whalefall sites and CBCs (coastal blue carbon ecosystems).

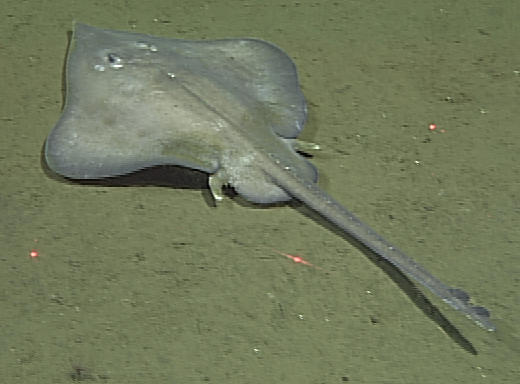
Deepsea skate on the Davidson Seamount at 2373 meters depth.

== Biology ==
The deep-sea skate is oviparous. The egg cases are oblong capsules with stiff, pointed horns at the corners, deposited on sandy or muddy flats. One egg case measured 105.8 mm long and 65.2 mm wide. The young may tend to follow large objects, such as their mother. Males mature at 110–120 cm and grow at least as large as 135 cm, while females attain at least 157 cm. The smallest known free-swimming specimens measured 34–36 cm.

When it comes to swimming, the deep-sea skate will use its pelvic fins to assist via punting. The deep-sea skate also uses its walking legs to not only move across the seafloor but also aid in lift off and maneuvering along canyon walls.

== Diet ==
Deep-sea skates typically feed on benthic organisms, including annelid worms, cephalopods, tanner crabs, shrimps, and bony fishes. Invertebrates comprise a greater proportion of the diet than fishes in juveniles below 1 m.

== Conservation and human impact ==
In recent years, it has been noted that skate populations have been on the decline and the deep-sea skate species is listed as one of the many. It has been reported to be commonly caught by deep-water fisheries located in the northeast Pacific Ocean. It is also considered to be harmless to humans.

While there is still not a lot of information regarding this species, the IUCN Red List lists B. abyssicola as of Least Concern. Current ongoing research regarding the species includes the impact of by-catch and deep-water fisheries on the population numbers as well as identification of key habitats.
