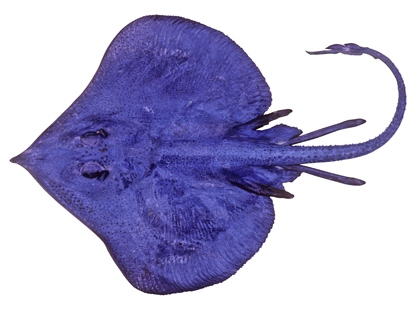
- Notoraja azurea

Scientific classification
- Kingdom: Animalia
- Phylum: Chordata
- Class: Chondrichthyes
- Subclass: Elasmobranchii
- Order: Rajiformes
- Family: Arhynchobatidae
- Genus: Notoraja; Ishiyama, 1958

Type species
- Raja tobitukai Hiyama, 1940

= Notoraja =

Genus of cartilaginous fishes

Notoraja is a genus of skates in the family Arhynchobatidae. They are found in deep water in the Indian and western Pacific Oceans.

== Species ==
There are currently 15 recognized species in this genus:

- Notoraja alisae Séret & Last, 2012 (Alis skate)
- Notoraja azurea McEachran & Last, 2008 (Blue skate)
- Notoraja fijiensis Séret & Last, 2012 (Fiji skate)
- Notoraja hesperindica Weigmann, Séret & Stehmann, 2021 (Western blue skate)
- Notoraja hirticauda Last & McEachran, 2006 (Ghost skate)
- Notoraja inusitata Séret & Last, 2012 (Strange skate)
- Notoraja lira McEachran & Last, 2008 (Broken Ridge skate)
- Notoraja longiventralis Séret & Last, 2012 (Long-ventral skate)
- Notoraja martinezi Concha, Ebert & Long, 2016 (Barbedwire-tailed skate)
- Notoraja ochroderma McEachran & Last, 1994 (Pale skate)
- Notoraja sapphira Séret & Last, 2009 (Sapphire skate)
- Notoraja sereti White, Last & Mana, 2017 (Papuan velvet skate)
- Notoraja sticta McEachran & Last, 2008 (Blotched skate)
- Notoraja tobitukai (Hiyama, 1940) (Lead-hued skate)
- Notoraja yurii Dolganov, 2021
