= Brochiraja =

Scientific classification
- Kingdom: Animalia
- Phylum: Chordata
- Class: Chondrichthyes
- Subclass: Elasmobranchii
- Order: Rajiformes
- Family: Arhynchobatidae
- Genus: Brochiraja; Last & McEachran, 2006

Genus of cartilaginous fishes

Brochiraja is a genus of deep-sea skates in the family Arhynchobatidae containing eight species. They are found in the waters around New Zealand and the Tasman Sea.

== Species ==
- Brochiraja aenigma Last & McEachran, 2006 (Enigma skate)
- Brochiraja albilabiata Last & McEachran, 2006
- Brochiraja asperula (Garrick & Paul, 1974) (Smooth deep-sea skate)
- Brochiraja heuresa Last & Séret, 2012
- Brochiraja leviveneta Last & McEachran, 2006
- Brochiraja microspinifera Last & McEachran, 2006
- Brochiraja spinifera (Garrick & Paul, 1974) (Prickly deep-sea skate)
- Brochiraja vittacauda Last & Séret, 2012
