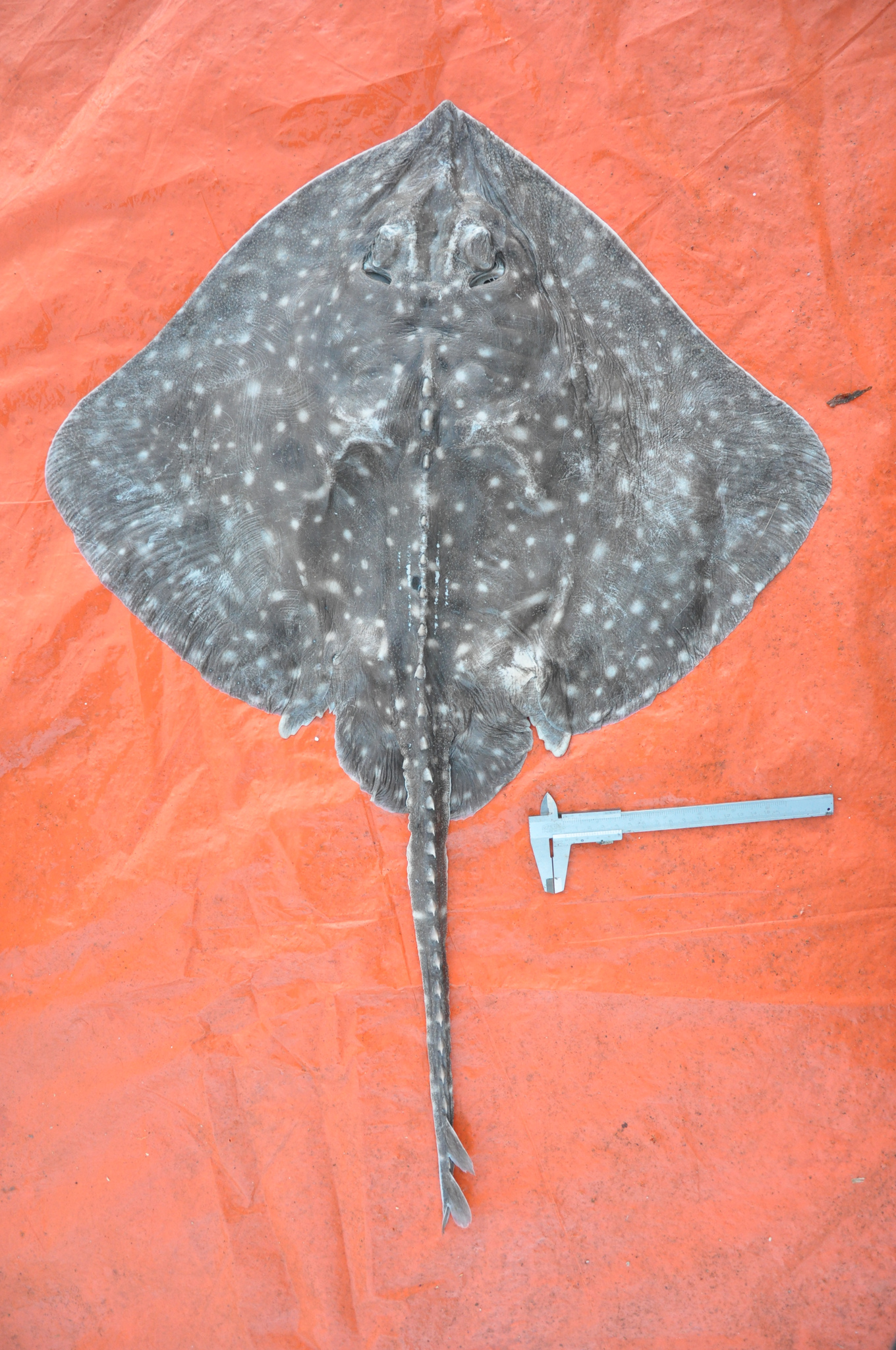

Conservation status
- Vulnerable (IUCN 3.1)

Scientific classification
- Kingdom: Animalia
- Phylum: Chordata
- Class: Chondrichthyes
- Subclass: Elasmobranchii
- Order: Rajiformes
- Family: Arhynchobatidae
- Genus: Bathyraja
- Species: B. albomaculata

Binomial name
- Bathyraja albomaculata (Norman, 1937)

= White-dotted skate =

Species of cartilaginous fish

The white-dotted skate (Bathyraja albomaculata) is a species of skate in the family Arhynchobatidae. It is found in the south-western Atlantic off the coast of Uruguay, Argentina and the Falkland Islands and uncommonly off Chile (Guamblin Island) in the south-eastern Pacific Ocean, at depths ranging from 55 to 861 metres. Males reach maturity at the age of about 11 years and females about 10 years. At maturity the total length of males is about 62.8 cm and females 65.3 cm. The oldest reported specimen was 17 years old. The maximum length has been estimated to be almost one metre. It is oviparous. Egg capsules are oblong having horned corners, the horns at the back end appear first and are longer, and thinner than the front ones. Capsules are barrel-shaped, quite smooth, yellow-brown when freshly laid, but they get darker. Egg laying has been observed year-round, but most frequently in autumn and winter. The animal eats mainly benthopelagic gammarids and polychaetes and also isopods. Juvenile white-dotted skates eat mostly gammarid amphipods, while adults eat mostly polychaetes.
