= Aguja =

Aguja (Spanish for needle) may refer to:

- Aguja (Marvel Comics), character in Marvel Comics
- Aguja (meat), pork shoulder blade cut
- Aguja Formation, geological formation in Texas and Mexico
- Aguja Saint Exupery, mountain spear in Patagonia, Argentina
- Aguja skate (Bathyraja aguja), species of fish
