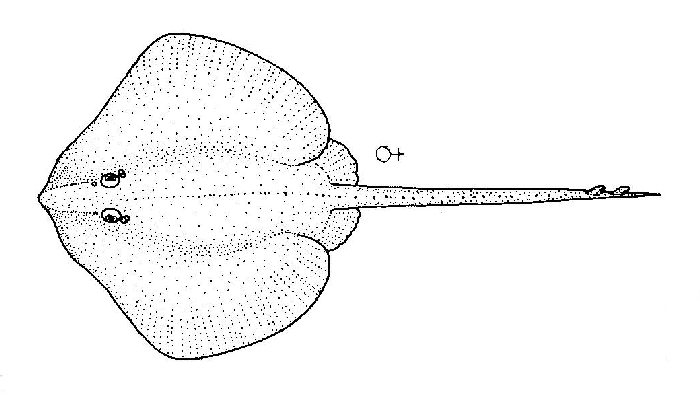
- Drawing by Dr Tony Ayling

Conservation status
- Data Deficient (IUCN 3.1)

Scientific classification
- Kingdom: Animalia
- Phylum: Chordata
- Class: Chondrichthyes
- Subclass: Elasmobranchii
- Order: Rajiformes
- Family: Arhynchobatidae
- Genus: Brochiraja
- Species: B. spinifera

Binomial name
- Brochiraja spinifera (Garrick & Paul, 1974)

Synonyms
- Bathyraja spinifera Garrick & Paul, 1974; Notoraja spinifera (Garrick & Paul, 1974); Pavoraja spinifera (Garrick & Paul, 1974)

= Prickly deep-sea skate =

Species of cartilaginous fish

The prickly deep-sea skate (Brochiraja spinifera), also known as the spiny deep-sea skate, is a deep sea skate in the family Arhynchobatidae. It lives off New Zealand, at depths of from 170 to 1,400 m on the continental shelf. Their length is from 60 to 80 cm.

== Conservation status ==
The New Zealand Department of Conservation classifies the prickly deep-sea skate as "Data deficient" under the New Zealand Threat Classification System.
