= Kiyomatsu Matsubara =

Japanese biologist

Kiyomatsu Matsubara (松原 喜代松, Matsubara Kiyomatsu; February 10, 1907 – December 12, 1968) was a Japanese marine biologist, ichthyologist, and herpetologist.

Born Kiyomatsu Sakamoto in Hyogo Prefecture, Kiyomatsu Matsubara was the first professor of the Department of Fisheries of the University of Kyoto and is considered to be the founder of Japanese research on fish systematics. He changed his name to "Matsubara" in the early 1930s. He has focused his research primarily on the scorpionfish (Scorpaeniformes) and published many books and scholarly articles. He described several new species of fish, including the crocodile shark (Pseudocarcharias kamoharai).

Species named after him include the rays Bathyraja matsubarai (Ishiyama, 1952) and Dasyatis matsubarai Miyosi, 1939.

== Taxon described by him ==
- See Category:Taxa named by Kiyomatsu Matsubara

== Taxon named in his honor ==
- The Dusky-purple skate, Bathyraja matsubarai (Ishiyama, 1952), is a species of skate in the family Arhynchobatidae found in the Northwest Pacific Ocean.
