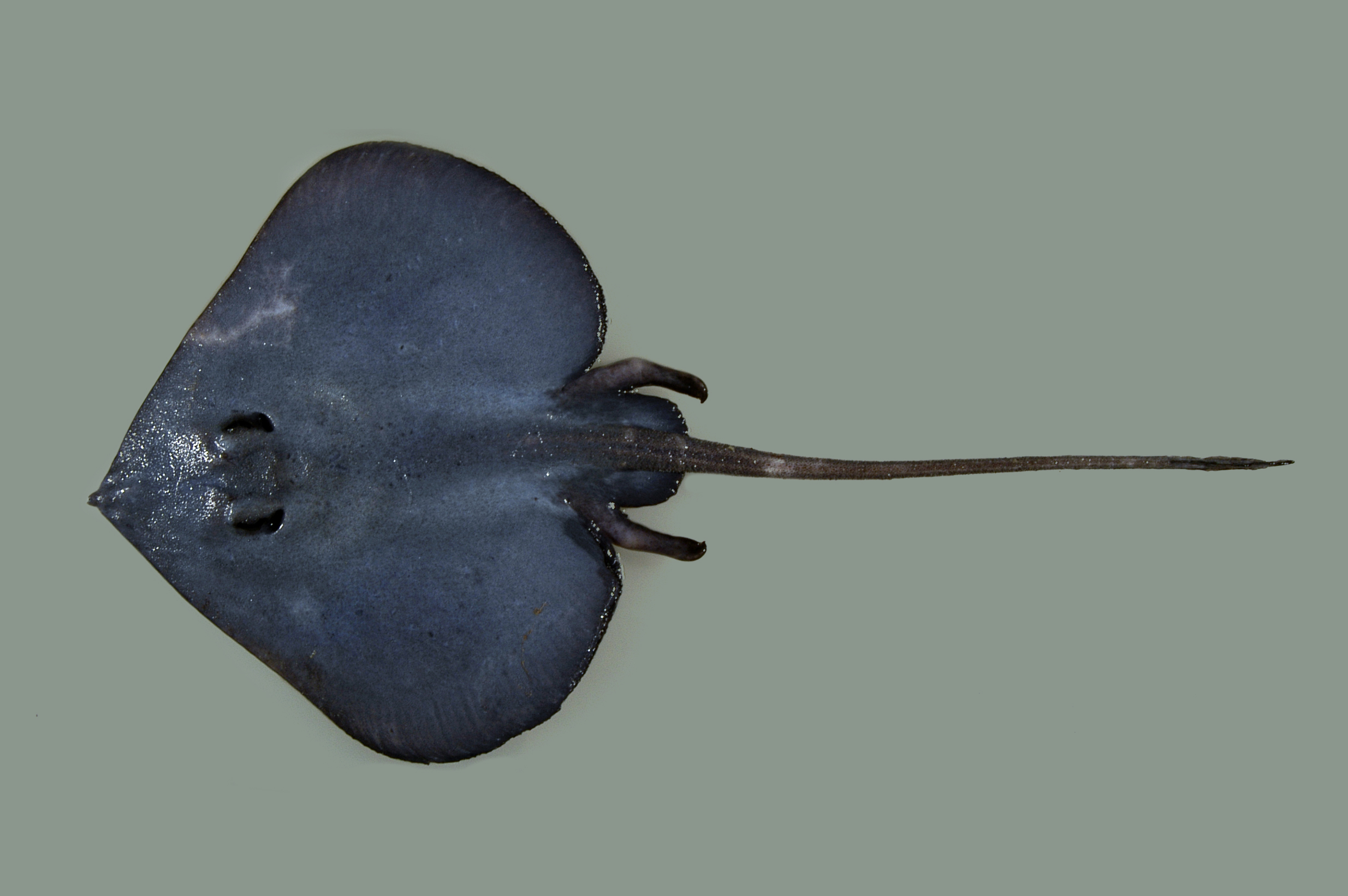
- Insentiraja subtilispinosa

Scientific classification
- Kingdom: Animalia
- Phylum: Chordata
- Class: Chondrichthyes
- Subclass: Elasmobranchii
- Order: Rajiformes
- Family: Arhynchobatidae
- Genus: Insentiraja; Yearsley & Last, 1992

= Insentiraja =

Genus of cartilaginous fishes

Insentiraja is a genus of skates in the family Arhynchobatidae commonly known as looseskin skates. The genus contains two known species, both of which occur in deep water in the western-central Pacific Ocean.

== Species ==
- Insentiraja laxipella (Yearsley & Last, 1992) (Eastern looseskin skate)
- Insentiraja subtilispinosa (Stehmann, 1989) (Velvet skate)
