= Prickly skate =

Prickly skate may refer to the following fish species

- Banded guitarfish (Zapteryx exasperata)
- Pacific starry skate (Raja stellulata)
- Prickly deepsea skate (Brochiraja asperula)
