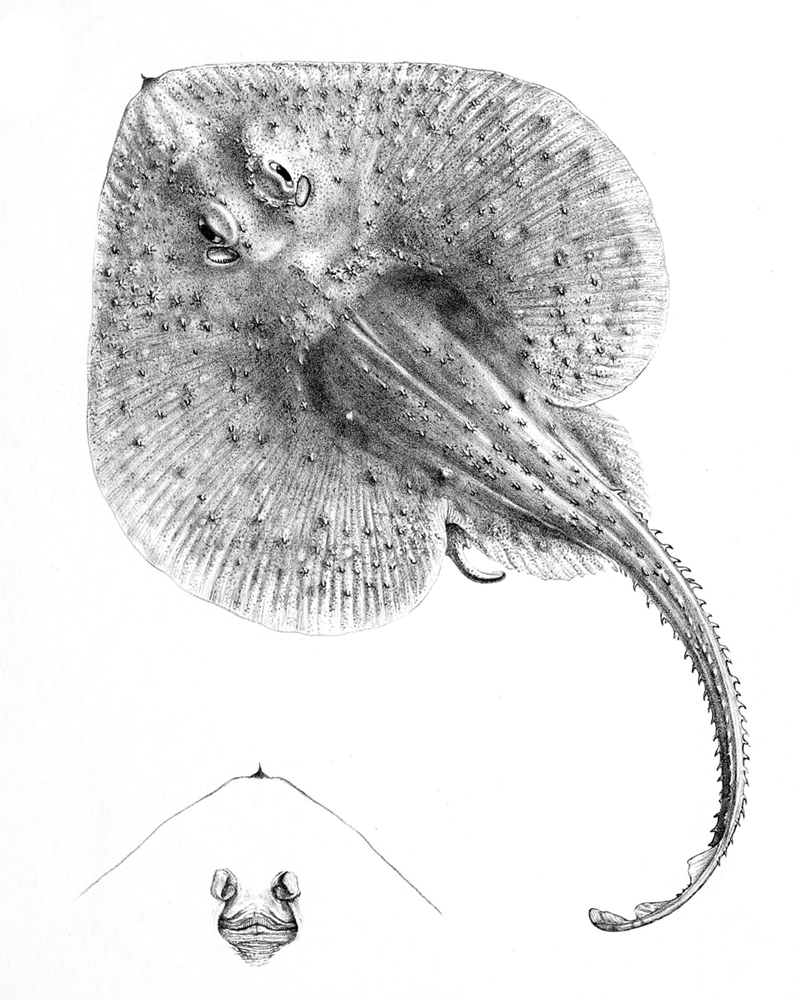
- Psammobatis rutrum

Scientific classification
- Kingdom: Animalia
- Phylum: Chordata
- Class: Chondrichthyes
- Subclass: Elasmobranchii
- Order: Rajiformes
- Family: Arhynchobatidae
- Genus: Psammobatis; Günther, 1870

= Psammobatis =

Genus of cartilaginous fishes

Psammobatis, commonly known as sand skates, is a genus of skates in the family Arhynchobatidae. These fish are found in the Atlantic and Pacific oceans off southern South America.

== Species ==
- Psammobatis bergi Marini, 1932 (Blotched sand skate)
- Psammobatis extenta (Garman, 1913) (Zipper sand skate)
- Psammobatis lentiginosa McEachran, 1983 (Freckled sand skate)
- Psammobatis normani McEachran, 1983 (Shortfin sand skate)
- Psammobatis parvacauda McEachran, 1983 (Smalltail sand skate)
- Psammobatis rudis Günther, 1870 (Smallthorn sand skate)
- Psammobatis rutrum D. S. Jordan, 1891 (Spade sand skate)
- Psammobatis scobina (Philippi {Krumweide}, 1857) (Raspthorn sand skate)
