= Illegal, unreported and unregulated fishing in the South Pacific =

Illegal, unreported, and unregulated fishing (IUU) in the South Pacific represents an understudied and underrepresented threat, that outside work by the Western and Central Pacific Fisheries Commission (WCPFC) is struggling with oversight and supervision. This lack of oversight due to the scattered populations overseeing vast exclusive economic zones (EEZ) is resulting in significant economical and environmental damage in communities that rely on fisheries to survive.

== Extent ==
The main type of the fish involved in IUU fishing in the South Pacific is various types of tuna; skipjack tuna, yellowfin tuna, and bigeye tuna. During the 2017-19 period best estimates show that 192,186 tonnes of tuna was harvested or transhipped; representing $333.49m in economic loss, or around 6.5% of the total WCPFC-CA catches in 2019. This does show a significant decrease compared to the 2016 study that showed the 306,440 tonnes of tuna representing $616.11m in estimated value.

Most of the illegal fishing is represented by misreporting, both in unloading more than reported, or quantity in transhipments that deliver to outside WCPFC monitored waters. Representing 89% of the volume of IUU fishing, or 87% of the value.

Types of IUU Fishing in South Pacific 2017 - 2019
Risk	BE (t)	90% Range (t)	BE ($)	90% range ($)
Unlicensed fishing	8,828	5,457 - 12,779	$14.6m	$10.1m - $19.93m
Misreporting	171,548	165,096 - 178,079	$289.80m	$271.71m - $311.77m
Other License conditions	5,504	4,488 - 6,787	$10.22m	$8.38m - $12.25m
Post-harvest risks	6,307	2,708 - 10,924	$18.85m	$9.69m - $29.30m

Much of the illegal activity is happening through the use of undocumented transshipments. These occur when ships leave the EEZ areas, turn off their Vehicle Monitoring Systems (VMS) or they go beyond the range of monitored areas. Illegal Tuna catches makeup 82% of the volume of IUU fishing, while making up 77% of the value.

Types of fish involved in IUU fishing in South Pacific 2017 - 2019
Species	BE (t)	90% range (t)	BE ($)	90% range ($)
Skipjack Tuna	51,296	46,646 - 56,365	$65.81m	$59.85m - $72.32m
Yellowfin Tuna	62,811	58,953 - 67,452	$83.64m	$73.45m - $101.79m
Bigeye Tuna	32,923	31,452 - 34,383	$65.27m	$56.89m - $73.33m
Albacore Tuna	3,403	2,936 - 3,860	$8.16m	$7.04m - $9.25m
Billfish	6,117	4,822 - 7,252	$33.20m	$26.17m - $39.36m
Other Species	35,636	31,202 - 39,555	$77.41m	$67.28m - $86.24m

There has also been a decrease in illegal shark catches and finning due to nations banning the practice, sale, and storage. Since the mid-2010s due to pressure from NGOs the larger logistics carriers operating in the region have stopped carrying them. Along with shark fin soup being prohibited at Chinese government functions, and Chinese celebrities taking a stance against the consumption of shark fin soup. The result has seen a drop in consumption in China and Hong Kong by 80%, and this number is expected to further contract.

== Impact ==
Most of the South Pacific Islands have little in the form of native sources of protein or land optimal for raising of ranch animals that cannot easily adapt to the environments. As such the fisheries industry is essential for survival in the region as has always been part of their culture. Looking at tuna catches, they are currently at a stable level. This does represent 6.5% of the tuna catches not going into local economies that would greatly benefit from the money compared to the larger flag states the illegal trawlers are coming from.

The larger impact is the trawlers that catch smaller fish impacting local fishery supplies. For instance, Tokelau's domestic fisheries, though small-scale, face declining catch-per-unit-effort (CPUE), going from 32.4 kg/kWdays in 1950 to 2.6 kg/kWdays by 2016. Bora-Bora's fisheries experience growth in overfishing, where juveniles are harvested before reaching optimal size, threatening long-term stock viability.

Furthermore climate change has resulted in changing migratory patterns, resulting in tuna supplies being further from ports resulting in a cyclical effect of more fossil fuel consumption to meet tuna demands. Thus impacting local reefs, and sea fauna and flora important to local populations.

== Prevention ==
Increased oversight has seen decreased IUU fishing in the region, through more VMS and port monitoring. Pacific Islands Forum's 2024 Transnational Crime Strategy represents a 15% reduction in illegal transshipments since 2020 through enhanced satellite surveillance and intelligence-sharing. Fiji's collaboration with the FFA to implement VMS reduced unauthorized incursions by foreign fleets by 20% between 2019 and 2023. And local communities have also been using traditional fishing methods such as Rāhui, which has increased the sustainability of local fishing populations.
