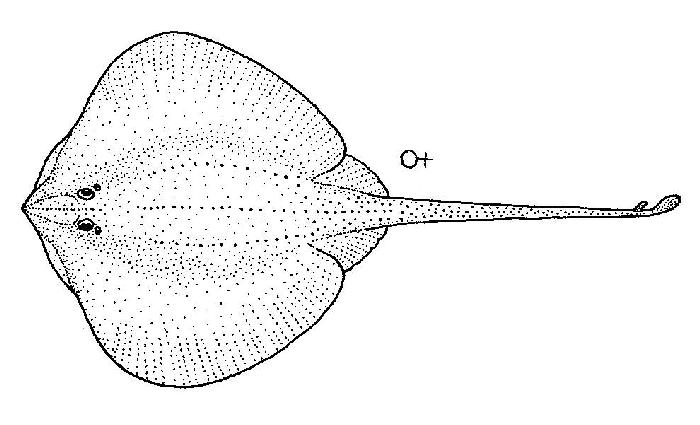
- Drawing by Dr Tony Ayling

Conservation status
- Data Deficient (IUCN 3.1)

Scientific classification
- Kingdom: Animalia
- Phylum: Chordata
- Class: Chondrichthyes
- Subclass: Elasmobranchii
- Order: Rajiformes
- Family: Arhynchobatidae
- Genus: Arhynchobatis; Waite, 1909
- Species: A. asperrimus

Binomial name
- Arhynchobatis asperrimus Waite, 1909

= Longtail skate =

Species of cartilaginous fish

The longtail skate (Arhynchobatis asperrimus) is a skate and is the only member of the genus Arhynchobatis. This species was first described by Edgar Ravenswood Waite in 1909. It is found off New Zealand at depths of from 90 to 1,000 m (300 to 3,280 ft) on the continental shelf. Its length is from 30 to 75 cm (12 to 30 in).

== Conservation status ==
The New Zealand Department of Conservation has classified the longtail skate as "Data deficient" under the New Zealand Threat Classification System.
