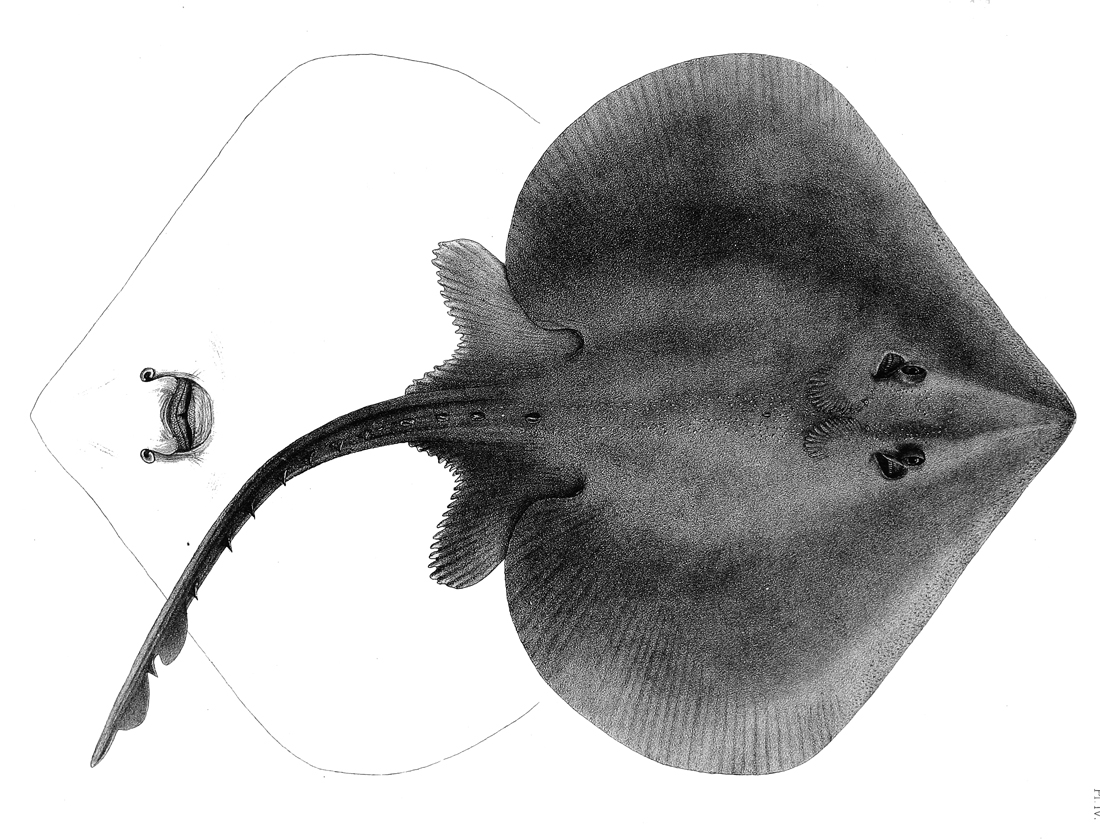
- Sympterygia bonapartii

Scientific classification
- Kingdom: Animalia
- Phylum: Chordata
- Class: Chondrichthyes
- Subclass: Elasmobranchii
- Order: Rajiformes
- Family: Arhynchobatidae
- Genus: Sympterygia; J. P. Müller and Henle, 1837

= Sympterygia =

Genus of cartilaginous fishes

Sympterygia is a genus of fish in the family Arhynchobatidae found in oceans off South America.

== Species ==
There are four species in the genus:

- Sympterygia acuta Garman, 1877 (Bignose fanskate)
- Sympterygia bonapartii J. P. Müller and Henle, 1841 (Smallnose fanskate)
- Sympterygia brevicaudata Cope, 1877 (Shorttail fanskate)
- Sympterygia lima Poeppig, 1835 (Filetail fanskate)
