= Broadnose skate =

Conservation status
- Near Threatened (IUCN 3.1)

Scientific classification
- Kingdom: Animalia
- Phylum: Chordata
- Class: Chondrichthyes
- Subclass: Elasmobranchii
- Order: Rajiformes
- Family: Arhynchobatidae
- Genus: Bathyraja
- Species: B. brachyurops

Binomial name
- Bathyraja brachyurops (Fowler, 1910)

Synonyms
- Breviraja brachyurops (Fowler, 1910); Raja brachyura (Günther, 1880); Raja brachyurops (Fowler, 1910)

Species of cartilaginous fish

Broadnose skate (Bathyraja brachyurops) is a species of skate in the family Arhynchobatidae. This fish occurs on 28 to 604 meters, mostly at depths shallower than 250 meters, from Valdivia and Estrecho de Magallanes to Argentina and the Falkland Islands. It has the maximum total length of about 125 centimetres (49 in) which it reaches in about 20 years. Both sexes reach maturity at age 8–10 years.
