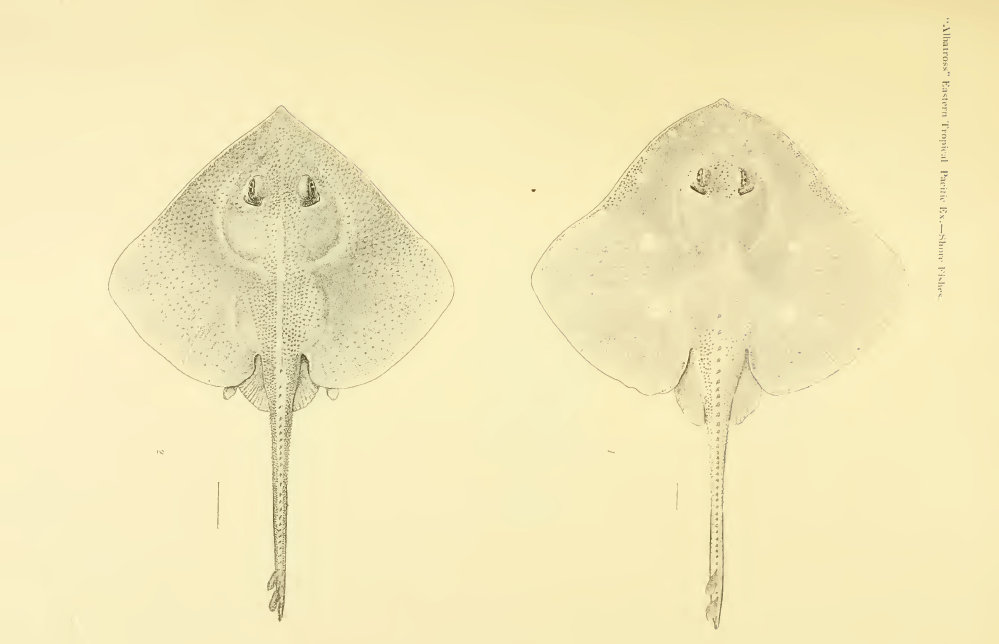

Conservation status
- Least Concern (IUCN 3.1)

Scientific classification
- Kingdom: Animalia
- Phylum: Chordata
- Class: Chondrichthyes
- Subclass: Elasmobranchii
- Order: Rajiformes
- Family: Arhynchobatidae
- Genus: Bathyraja
- Species: B. aguja

Binomial name
- Bathyraja aguja (Kendall & Radcliffe, 1912)

= Aguja skate =

Species of cartilaginous fish

The aguja skate (Bathyraja aguja) is a species of skate in the family Arhynchobatidae. Little is known about this fish. It has not been collected since its discovery in the open seas off the coast of Point Aguja, Peru in 1904.
