= Atlantic butterfly skate =

Conservation status
- Vulnerable (IUCN 3.1)

Scientific classification
- Kingdom: Animalia
- Phylum: Chordata
- Class: Chondrichthyes
- Subclass: Elasmobranchii
- Order: Rajiformes
- Family: Arhynchobatidae
- Genus: Bathyraja
- Species: B. papilionifera

Binomial name
- Bathyraja papilionifera M. F. W. Stehmann, 1985

Species of fish

The Atlantic butterfly skate (Bathyraja papilionifera) is a species of fish in the family Rajidae found off the coasts of South America in the South Atlantic Ocean.

== Etymology ==
The specific epithet papilionifera means “butterfly-bearing”, referring to the butterfly-shaped dark blotch around the anus.

== Description ==
Bathyraja papilionifera is a large deep-water skate with a chestnut-brown dorsal surface. Larger specimens may have small bluish-white spots on the disc. The underside is cream-white anteriorly and predominantly dark posteriorly, with a characteristic butterfly-shaped brown blotch surrounding the anus. The tail is predominantly dark brown.

== Habitat ==
The species was originally known from the continental slope off northern Argentina, at approximately 40° S, 56° W, where the type specimens were collected at depths of 660–1,040 m. Stehmann regarded it as a deep-water species and suggested that adults may occur at greater depths.
