= Pristiorajea =

Clade of cartilaginous fishes

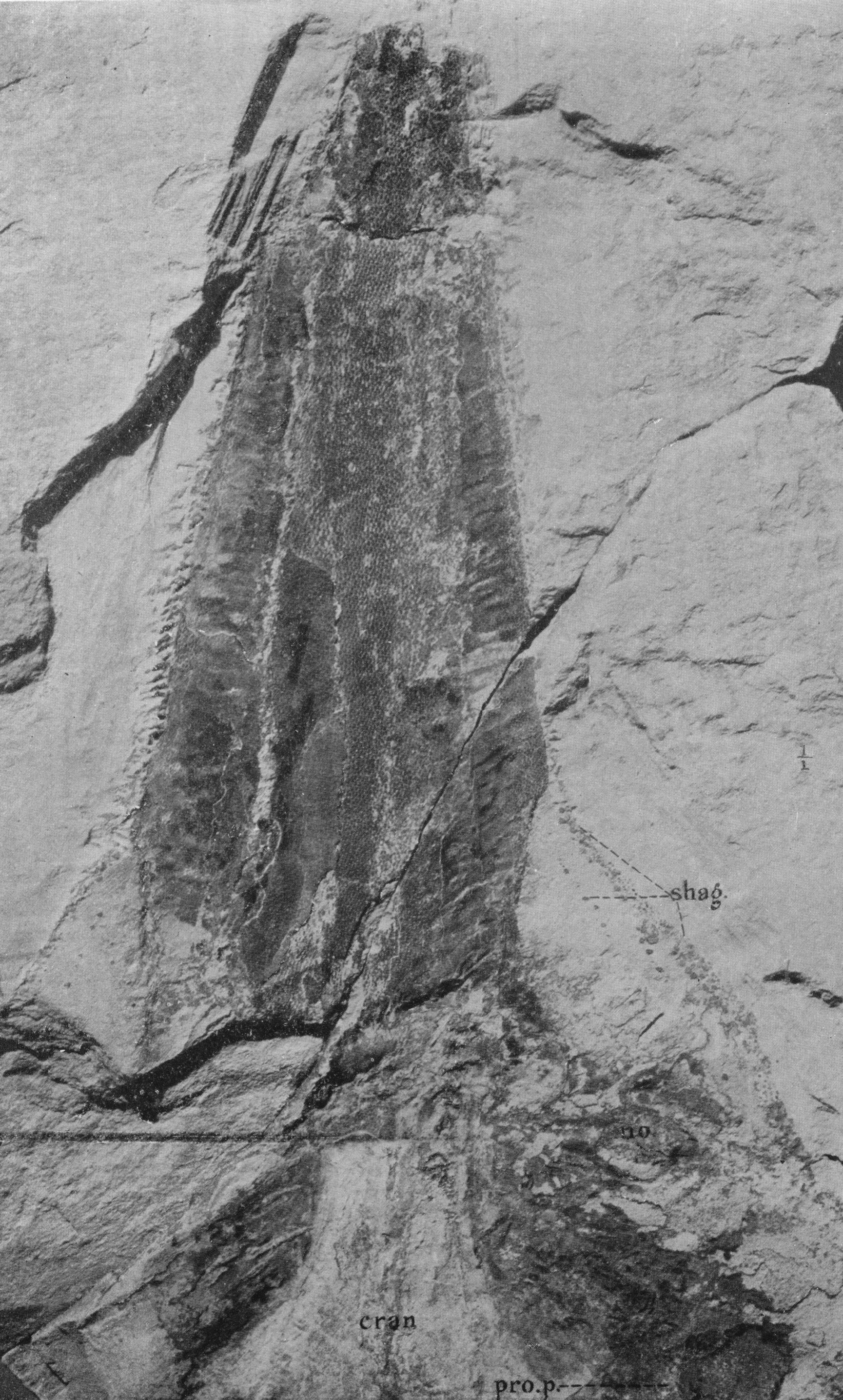
Micropristis solominis rostrum

Pristiorajea is a defunct clade of chondrichthyans containing the sawsharks (Pristiophoriformes) and rays (order Batoidea). It is sister to the Squatiniformes and shares a common ancestry with the Squaliformes. However, phylogenetic evidence supports rays and sharks as being monophyletic groupings and distinct from one another.
