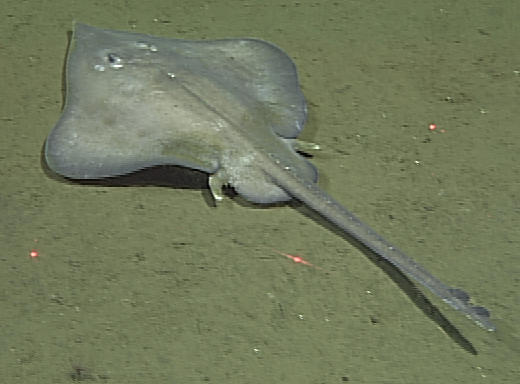
- Bathyraja abyssicola

Scientific classification
- Kingdom: Animalia
- Phylum: Chordata
- Class: Chondrichthyes
- Subclass: Elasmobranchii
- Order: Rajiformes
- Family: Arhynchobatidae
- Genus: Bathyraja; Ishiyama, 1958

Species
- See text

= Bathyraja =

Genus of fishes

Bathyraja is a large genus of skates in the family Arhynchobatidae.

== Species ==
There are 57 recognized species in this genus:

- Bathyraja abyssicola (Gilbert, 1896) (Deep-sea skate)
- Bathyraja aguja (Kendall & Radcliffe, 1912) (Aguja skate)
- Bathyraja albomaculata (Norman, 1937) (White-dotted skate)
- Bathyraja aleutica (Gilbert, 1896) (Aleutian skate)
- Bathyraja andriashevi (Dolganov, 1985) (Little-eyed skate)
- Bathyraja arctowskii (Dollo, 1904) (Antarctic dark-mouth skate)
- Bathyraja bergi (Dolganov, 1983) (Bottom skate)
- Bathyraja brachyurops (Fowler, 1910) (Broadnose skate)
- Bathyraja chapmani Ebert, (Alfaro-Shigueto, Velez-Zuazo, Pajuelo & Mangel, 2022) (Chapman's skate)
- Bathyraja cousseauae (Díaz de Astarloa & Mabragaña, 2004) (Joined-fins skate)
- Bathyraja diplotaenia (Ishiyama, 1952) (Dusky-pink skate)
- Bathyraja eatonii (Günther, 1876) (Eaton's skate)
- Bathyraja fedorovi (Dolganov, 1985) (Cinnamon skate)
- Bathyraja griseocauda (Norman, 1937) (Graytail skate)
- Bathyraja hesperafricana (Stehmann, 1995) (West African skate)
- Bathyraja interrupta (Gill & Townsend, 1897) (Sandpaper skate)
- Bathyraja irrasa (Hureau & Ozouf-Costaz, 1980) (Kerguelen sandpaper skate)
- Bathyraja ishiharai (Stehmann, 2005) (Abyssal Skate)
- Bathyraja isotrachys (Günther, 1877) (Raspback skate)
- Bathyraja kincaidii (Garman, 1908) (Sandpaper skate)
- Bathyraja leucomelanos (Iglésias & Lévy-Hartmann, 2012) (Domino Skate)
- Bathyraja lindbergi (Ishiyama & Ishihara, 1977) (Commander skate)
- Bathyraja longicauda (F. de Buen, 1959) (Slimtail skate)
- Bathyraja maccaini (Springer, 1971) (McCain's skate)
- Bathyraja macloviana (Norman, 1937) (Patagonian skate)
- Bathyraja maculata (Ishiyama & Ishihara, 1977) (White-blotched skate)
- Bathyraja magellanica (Philippi {Krumweide}, 1902) (Magellan skate)
- Bathyraja mariposa (Stevenson, Orr, Hoff & McEachran, 2004) (Butterfly skate)
- Bathyraja matsubarai (Ishiyama, 1952) (Dusky-purple skate)
- Bathyraja meridionalis (Stehmann, 1987) (Dark-belly skate)
- Bathyraja microtrachys (Osburn & Nichols, 1916) (Fine-spined skate)
- Bathyraja minispinosa (Ishiyama & Ishihara, 1977) (Smallthorn skate)
- Bathyraja multispinis (Norman, 1937) (Multispine skate)
- Bathyraja murrayi (Günther, 1880) (Murray's skate)
- Bathyraja nansei (Misawa, Moteki & Endo, 2025) (Nansei skate)
- Bathyraja notoroensis (Ishiyama & Ishihara, 1977) (Notoro skate)
- Bathyraja pacifica (Last, Peter R., Stewart, Andrew L. & Séret, Bernard, 2016) (Pacific Blonde Skate)
- Bathyraja pallida (Forster, 1967) (Pale ray)
- Bathyraja panthera (Orr, Stevenson, Hoff, Spies & McEachran, 2011) (Leopard skate)
- Bathyraja papilionifera (Stehmann, 1985) (Butterfly skate)
- Bathyraja parmifera (Bean, 1881) (Alaska skate)
- Bathyraja peruana (McEachran & Miyake, 1984) (Peruvian skate)
- Bathyraja richardsoni (Garrick, 1961) (Richardson's ray)
- Bathyraja scaphiops (Norman, 1937) (Cuphead skate)
- Bathyraja schroederi (Krefft, 1968) (Whitemouth skate)
- Bathyraja sexoculata (Misawa, Orlov, Orlova, Gordeev & Ishihara, 2020) (Simushir skate)
- Bathyraja shuntovi (Dolganov, 1985) (Longnose deep-sea skate)
- Bathyraja simoterus (Ishiyama, 1967) (Hokkaido skate)
- Bathyraja smirnovi (Soldatov & Pavlenko, 1915) (Golden skate)
- Bathyraja smithii (Müller & Henle, 1841) (African softnose skate)
- Bathyraja spinicauda (Jensen, 1914) (Spinytail skate)
- Bathyraja spinosissima (Beebe & Tee-Van, 1941) (Spiny skate)
- Bathyraja trachouros (Ishiyama, 1958) (Eremo skate)
- Bathyraja taranetzi (Dolganov, 1983) (Mud skate)
- Bathyraja trachura (Gilbert, 1892) (Roughtail skate)
- Bathyraja tunae (Stehmann, 2005)
- Bathyraja tzinovskii (Dolganov, 1985) (Creamback skate)
- Bathyraja violacea (Suvorov, 1935) (Okhotsk skate)
