= Catch per unit effort =

Method to measure the abundance of a target species

In fisheries and conservation biology, the catch per unit effort (CPUE) is an indirect measure of the abundance of a target species. Changes in the catch per unit effort are inferred to signify changes to the target species' true abundance. A decreasing CPUE indicates overexploitation, while an unchanging CPUE indicates sustainable harvesting.

CPUE has a number of advantages over other methods of measuring abundance. It does not interfere with routine harvesting operations, and data are easily collected. The data are also easy to analyse, even for non-specialists, in contrast to methods based on transects. This means that decisions about stock management can also be made by the people doing the harvesting. The best practice is to standardise the effort employed (e.g. number of traps or duration of searching), which controls for the reduction in catch size that often results from subsequent efforts.

Although CPUE is a relative measure of abundance, it can be used to estimate absolute abundances. The main difficulty when using measures of CPUE is to define the unit of effort. CPUE is also often nonlinearly related to abundance, making interpretation more difficult.

== See also ==
- List of commercially important fish species
- Sustainable fishery
