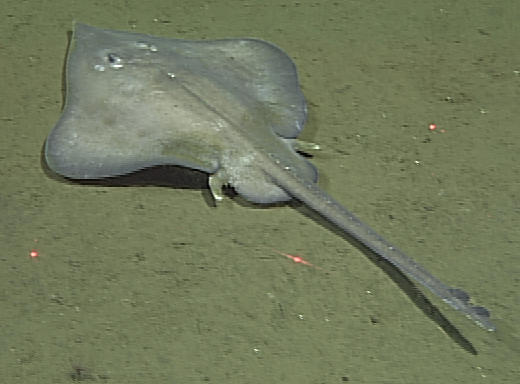
- Bathyraja abyssicola

Scientific classification
- Kingdom: Animalia
- Phylum: Chordata
- Class: Chondrichthyes
- Subclass: Elasmobranchii
- Order: Rajiformes
- Family: Arhynchobatidae; Fowler, 1934

Genera
- See text

= Arhynchobatidae =

Family of fishes

Arhynchobatidae is a family of skates whose members are commonly known as the softnose skates. It belongs to the order Rajiformes in the superorder Batoidea of rays. At least 104 species have been described, in 13 genera. Softnose skates have at times been placed in the same family as hardnose skates, but most recent authors recognize them as a distinct family. Members of the Arhynchobatidae can be distinguished from hardnose skates in having a soft and flexible snout, as well as a more or less reduced rostrum.

== Genera ==
Arhynchobatidae contains the following genera:

- Arctoraja Ishiyama, 1958
- Arhynchobatis Waite, 1909
- Atlantoraja Menni, 1972
- Bathyraja Ishiyama, 1958
- Brochiraja Last & McEachran, 2006
- Insentiraja Yearsley & Last, 1992
- Irolita Whitley, 1931
- Notoraja Ishiyama, 1958
- Pavoraja Whitley, 1939
- Psammobatis Günther, 1870
- Pseudoraja Bigelow & Schroeder, 1954
- Rhinoraja Ishiyama, 1952
- Rioraja Whitley, 1939
- Sympterygia J. P. Müller & Henle, 1837

== Conservation ==
In 2010, Greenpeace International added the spotback skate to its seafood red list. "The Greenpeace International seafood red list is a list of fish that are commonly sold in supermarkets around the world, and which have a very high risk of being sourced from unsustainable fisheries."
