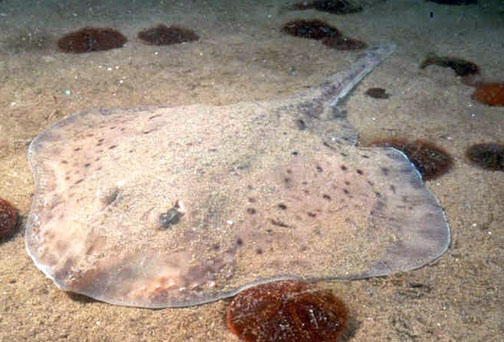
- Little skate (Leucoraja erinacea)

Scientific classification
- Kingdom: Animalia
- Phylum: Chordata
- Class: Chondrichthyes
- Clade: Euselachii
- Subclass: Elasmobranchii
- Division: Batomorphi
- Order: Rajiformes; L. S. Berg, 1940

= Rajiformes =

Rajiformes Temporal range: Pliensbachian–Recent

Order of fishes in the superorder Batoidea

Rajiformes /ˈrædʒɪfɔːrmiːz/ is one of the four orders in the clade Batomorphi, often referred to as the superorder Batoidea, flattened cartilaginous fishes related to sharks. Rajiforms are distinguished by the presence of greatly enlarged pectoral fins, which reach as far forward as the sides of the head, with a generally flattened body. The undulatory pectoral fin motion diagnostic to this taxon is known as rajiform locomotion. The eyes and spiracles are located on the upper surface of the head and the gill slits are on the underside of the body. All skates lay eggs enclosed in a horny capsule ("mermaid's purse").

== Characteristics ==
Rajoids typically have a dorsoventrally flattened body. The snout is slender and pointed and the wide mouth, often covered with a fleshy nasal flap, is on the underside of the head. The eyes and well-developed spiracles are located on the top of the head. In most species, the spiracles are large and are the main means of drawing water in for respiration. There is no nictitating membrane and the cornea is continuous, with the skin surrounding the eyes. The gill slits are on the ventral surface just behind the head. The front few vertebrae are fused into a synarcual and this either articulates with the bones of the well-developed pectoral girdle or is fused to them, the suprascapulae uniting above the vertebral column. Most species have enlarged, thornlike dermal denticles on their skin, often with a row of large denticles along the spine.

The pectoral fins are large, but not clearly demarcated from the body, and together with the body are known as the disc. They start from the side of the head in front of the gill openings and end at the caudal peduncle. There are up to two dorsal fins but no anal fin. A slender tail is clearly demarcated from the disc. The caudal fin varies in size between species and the rays have a whip-like tail with no caudal fin.

== Distribution ==
Species of the order Rajiformes are found throughout the world's oceans, from Arctic to Antarctic waters, and from shallow coastal shelves to open seas and abyssal regions. A few are found in rivers and some in estuaries, but most are marine, living near the sea bed at depths down to 3,000 m (9,800 ft) or more.

== Diversity ==
Skates are the most diverse elasmobranch group, comprising over 20% of the known species (about 250 valid species). Since 1950, 126 new species of skates have been discovered. Five scientists take credit for the rapid increase of findings.

=== Families ===
Four extant and five extinct families of rajoid have been described:

- Anacanthobatidae
- Arhynchobatidae
- Gurgesiellidae
- Rajidae
- †Sclerorhynchoidei
  - †Ischyrhizidae
  - †Sclerorhynchidae
  - †Onchopristidae
  - †Ptychotrygonidae
  - †Schizorhizidae

Formerly, some Rhinopristiforms were also included.

The smooth skates, the Anacanthobatidae, contain a single genus, Anacanthobatis, of about 10 species. They are small fish living on the continental slopes of tropical and subtropical waters, and are native to Natal, South Africa, tropical West Africa, and Taiwan. Smooth skates have a filament extending from a rounded protuberance on the snout. Both the dorsal and ventral surfaces are smooth and have no dermal denticles. The tail is slender and a little shorter than the body. No dorsal fins are present and the caudal fin is small and membranous.

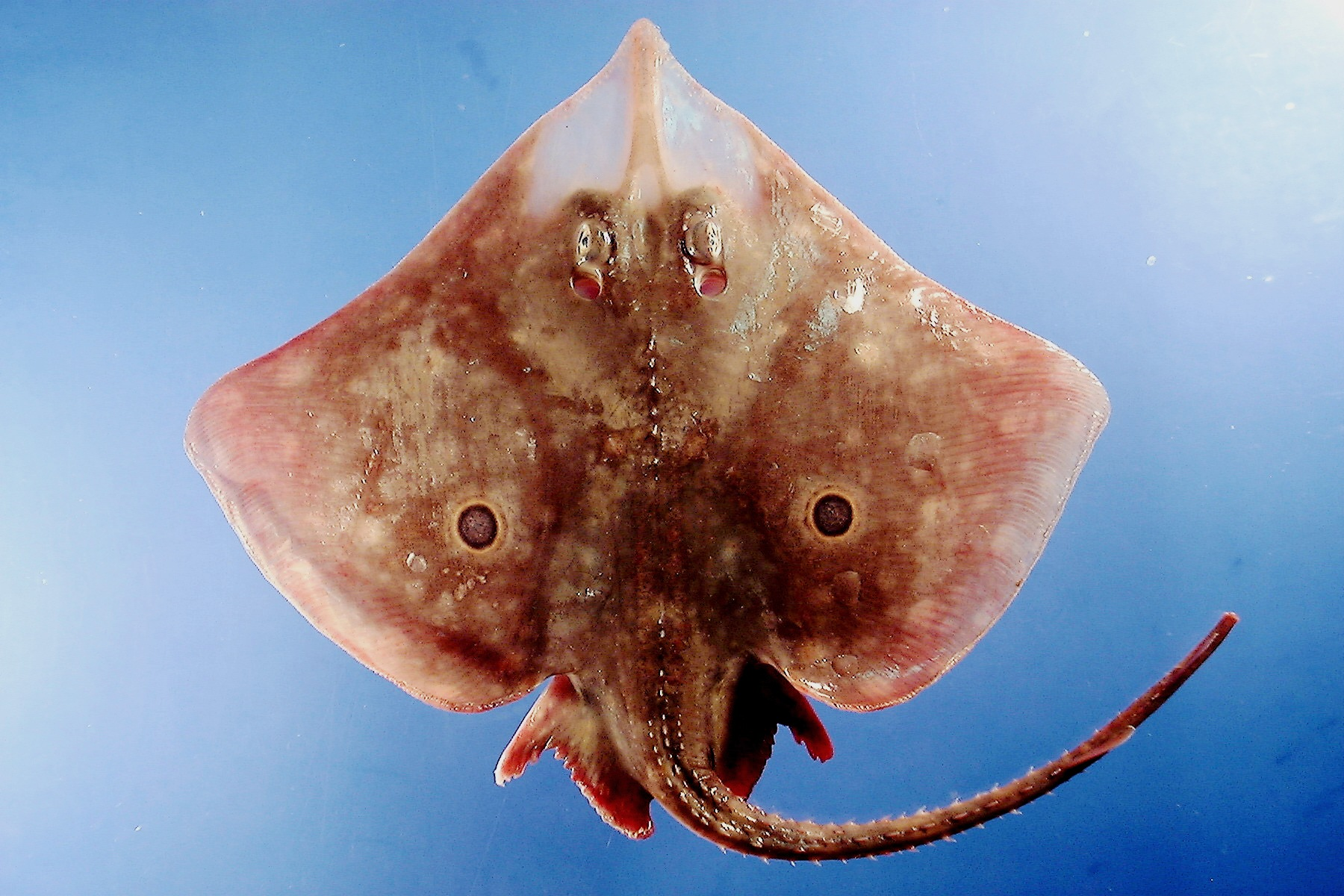
Raja texana, the roundel skate

The skate family Rajidae contains more species than any other genera. They are found worldwide, but are relatively uncommon near coral reefs and in shallow tropical seas. A few species occur in brackish water. The disc shape is rhomboidal, and the tail long. Two dorsal fins are found and the caudal fin is much reduced. The pelvic fins have two lobes. Most species have rough skins with dermal denticles which are especially obvious along the spine. The eggs are laid in a protective hard case with string-like elongations at the four corners.

The extinct families Sclerorhynchidae and Ptychotrygonidae had long, serrated rostrums very similar to those of extant sawsharks and sawfishes, and their relation to them has been debated. A 2004 study found sawsharks to actually be the most basal of batoids rather than true sharks, with the order Sclerorhynchiformes containing Sclerorhynchidae and Ischyrhizidae and forming a sister group to sawfish and all other rays, with the clade containing sawsharks and rays being coined Pristiorajea. However, further studies have affirmed that sawsharks are true sharks and a member of Selachimorpha. Later studies have instead found Sclerorhynchiformes to form a sister group to Rajidae, and thus downgraded it to being the suborder Sclerorhynchoidei of the order Rajiformes.

== Biology ==
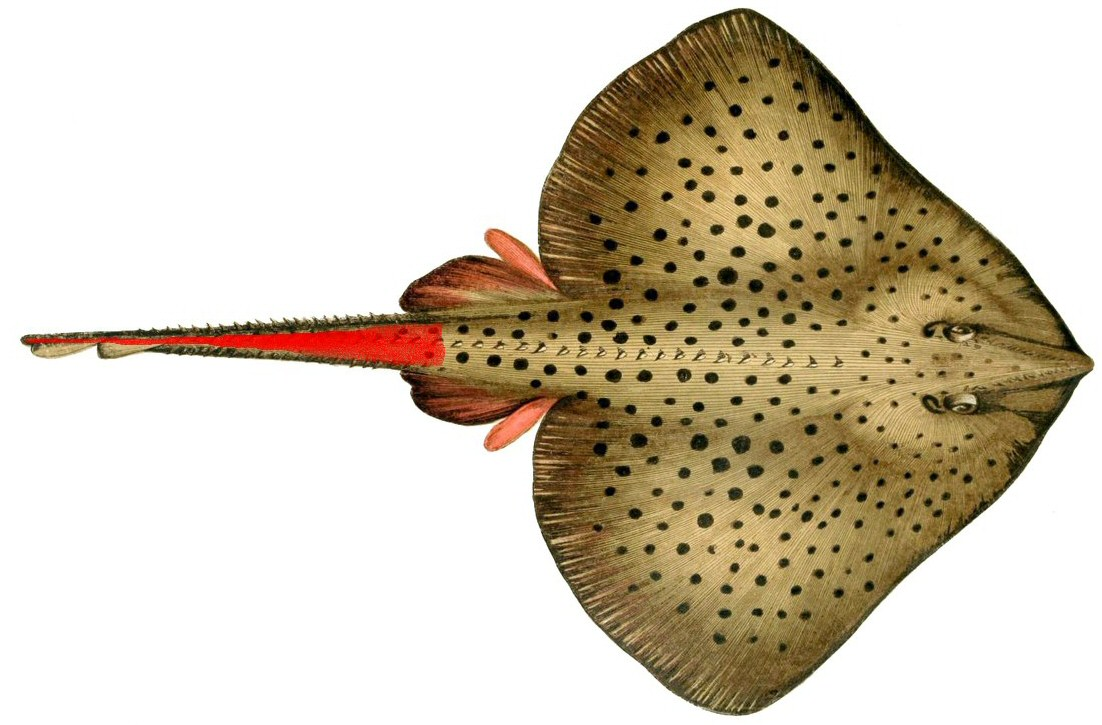
Skates have an electric organ in the tail. They use it to generate a weak electric field to locate their prey.

Water for breathing is taken in through the spiracles rather than or the mouth and exits through the gill slits. Skates swim by undulating their enlarged pectoral fins, and are capable of "walking" (the technical term is punting) using their pelvic fins. Skates are carnivores, feeding on molluscs and other invertebrates on the sea bed, and small fish. Unlike other batiods which have live birth, skates lay eggs in horny cases known as mermaid's purses. Most species are benthic, resting on the sandy or muddy sea bed, sometimes undulating their pectoral fins to stir up sediment and bury themselves shallowly.
