= List of cartilaginous fish =

The following is the full list of the extant species in Class Chondrichthyes, or the cartilaginous fish. Members of this class have a backbone, gills, no swim bladder, jaws, and a skeleton made of cartilage, a soft, strong material as a replacement for bone.

== Subclass Holocephali ==
=== Order Chimaeriformes ===
- Family Callorhinchidae Garman 1901
  - Genus Callorhinchus Lacépède 1798 (Plownose chimaera)
    - Callorhinchus callorynchus Linnaeus 1758 (ploughnose chimaera)
    - Callorhinchus capensis Duméril 1865 (Cape elephantfish)
    - Callorhinchus milii Bory de Saint-Vincent 1823 (Australian ghost shark)
- Family Chimaeridae Bonaparte, 1831 (Shortnose chimaeras or ratfishes)
  - Genus Chimaera Linnaeus 1758
    - Chimaera argiloba Last, White & Pogonoski 2008 (whitefin chimaera)
    - Chimaera bahamaensis Kemper, Ebert, Didier & Compagno 2010 (Bahamas ghost shark)
    - Chimaera cubana Howell-Rivero 1936 (Cuban chimaera)
    - Chimaera fulva Didier, Last & White 2008 (southern chimaera)
    - Chimaera jordani Tanaka 1905 (Jordan's chimaera)
    - Chimaera lignaria Didier 2002 (carpenter's chimaera)
    - Chimaera macrospina Didier, Last & White 2008 (longspine chimaera)
    - Chimaera monstrosa Linnaeus 1758 (rabbit fish)
    - Chimaera notafricana Kemper, Ebert, Compagno & Didier 2010 (Cape chimaera)
    - Chimaera obscura Didier, Last & White 2008 (shortspine chimaera)
    - Chimaera opalescens Luchetti, Iglésias & Sellos 2011 (Opal chimaera)
    - Chimaera orientatis Angulo, López, Bussing & Murase 2014 (Eastern Pacific black chimaera)
    - Chimaera owstoni Tanaka 1905 (Owston's chimaera)
    - Chimaera panthera Didier 1998 (leopard chimaera)
    - Chimaera phantasma Jordan & Snyder 1900 (silver chimaera)
  - Genus Hydrolagus Gill 1863
    - Hydrolagus affinis de Brito Capello 1868 (smalleyed rabbitfish)
    - Hydrolagus africanus Gilchrist 1922 (African chimaera)
    - Hydrolagus alberti Bigelow & Schroeder 1951 (Gulf chimaera)
    - Hydrolagus alphus Quaranta, Didier, Long & Ebert 2006
    - Hydrolagus barbouri Garman 1908 (Ninespot chimaera)
    - Hydrolagus bemisi Didier 2002 (pale ghost shark)
    - Hydrolagus colliei Lay & Bennett 1839 (spotted ratfish)
    - Hydrolagus deani Smith & Radcliffe 1912 (Philippine chimaera)
    - Hydrolagus eidolon Jordan & Hubbs 1925
    - Hydrolagus homonycteris Didier 2008 (black ghostshark)
    - Hydrolagus lemures Whitley, 1939 (blackfin ghostshark)
    - Hydrolagus lusitanicus Moura, Figueiredo, Bordalo-Machado, Almeida & Gordo 2005
    - Hydrolagus macrophthalmus de Buen 1959 (Bigeye chimaera)
    - Hydrolagus marmoratus Didier, 2008 (marbled ghostshark)
    - Hydrolagus matallanasi Soto & Vooren 2004 (Brazilian striped rabbitfish)
    - Hydrolagus mccoskeri Barnett, Didier, Long & Ebert 2006 (Galápagos ghostshark)
    - Hydrolagus melanophasma James, Ebert, Long & Didier 2009 (Eastern Pacific black ghostshark)
    - Hydrolagus mirabilis Collett 1904 (large-eyed rabbitfish)
    - Hydrolagus mitsukurii Jordan & Snyder 1904 (spookfish)
    - Hydrolagus novaezealandiae Fowler 1911 (dark ghostshark)
    - Hydrolagus ogilbyi Waite 1898
    - Hydrolagus pallidus Hardy & Stehmann 1990
    - Hydrolagus purpurescens Gilbert 1905 (purple chimaera)
    - Hydrolagus trolli Didier & Séret 2002 (pointy-nosed blue chimaera)
    - Hydrolagus waitei Fowler 1907
- Family Rhinochimaeridae Garman 1901 (Longnose chimaeras)
  - Genus Harriotta Goode & Bean 1895
    - Harriotta haeckeli Karrer 1972 (smallspine spookfish)
    - Harriotta raleighana Goode & Bean 1895 (Pacific longnose chimaera)
  - Genus Neoharriotta Bigelow & Schroeder 1950 (sicklefin chimaera)
    - Neoharriotta carri Bullis & Carpenter 1966 (dwarf sicklefin chimaera)
    - Neoharriotta pinnata Schnakenbeck 1931 (sicklefin chimaera)
    - Neoharriotta pumila Didier & Stehmann 1996 (Arabian sicklefin chimaera)
  - Genus Rhinochimaera Garman 1901
    - Rhinochimaera africana Compagno, Stehmann & Ebert 1990 (paddlenose chimaera)
    - Rhinochimaera atlantica Holt & Byrne 1909 (straightnose rabbitfish)
    - Rhinochimaera pacifica Mitsukuri 1895 (Pacific spookfish)

== Subclass Elasmobranchii ==
=== Superorder Batoidea ===
==== Order Torpediniformes ====
- Suborder Platyrhinoidei
  - Family Platyrhinidae Jordan 1923 (Thornbacks & fanrays)
    - Genus Platyrhina Müller & Henle 1838 (Fanrays)
      - Platyrhina hyugaensis Iwatsuki, Miyamoto & Nakaya 2011 (Hyuga fanray)
      - Platyrhina sinensis Bloch & Schneider 1801 (common fanray)
      - Platyrhina tangi Iwatsuki, Zhang & Nakaya 2011 (Yellow-spotted fanray)
    - Genus Platyrhinoidis Garman 1881
      - Platyrhinoidis triseriata Jordan & Gilbert 1880 (Thornback guitarfish)
- Suborder Torpedinoidei
  - Family Hypnidae Gill 1862
    - Genus Hypnos Duméril 1852
      - Hypnos monopterygium (Shaw 1795) (coffin ray)
  - Family Torpedinidae Henle 1834 (electric rays)
    - Genus Torpedo Houttuyn 1764 non Forsskål ex Niebuhr 1775
      - Subgenus (Torpedo)
        - Torpedo torpedo (Linnaeus 1758) (Common torpedo)
        - Torpedo marmorata Risso 1810 (Marbled electric ray)
        - Torpedo sinuspersici Olfers 1831 (Variable torpedo)
        - Torpedo panthera Olfers 1831 (Leopard torpedo)
        - Torpedo fuscomaculata Peters 1855 (Black-spotted torpedo)
        - Torpedo suessi Steindachner 1898
        - Torpedo zugmayeri (Engelhardt 1912)
        - Torpedo mackayana Metzelaar 1919 (Ringed torpedo)
        - Torpedo andersoni Bullis 1962 (Florida torpedo)
        - Torpedo bauchotae Cadenat, Capapé & Desoutter 1978 (Rosette torpedo)
        - Torpedo adenensis Carvalho, Stehmann & Manilo 2002 (Aden Gulf torpedo)
        - Torpedo formosa Haas & Ebert 2006 (Taiwan torpedo)
      - Subgenus (Tetronarce) Gill 1862
        - Torpedo cowleyi (Ebert, Haas & de Carvalho 2015) (Cowley's torpedo ray)
        - Torpedo nobiliana Bonaparte 1835 (Atlantic torpedo)
        - Torpedo californica Ayres 1855 (Pacific electric ray)
        - Torpedo fairchildi Hutton 1872 (New Zealand torpedo)
        - Torpedo tokionis (Tanaka 1908) (Trapezoid torpedo)
        - Torpedo puelcha Lahille 1926 (Argentine torpedo)
        - Torpedo macneilli (Whitley 1932) (Shorttail torpedo)
        - Torpedo tremens de Buen 1959 (Chilean torpedo)
        - Torpedo peruana Chirichigno 1963
        - Torpedo microdiscus Parin & Kotlyar 1985 (Smalldisk torpedo)
        - Torpedo semipelagica Parin & Kotlyar 1985 (Semipelagic/Alexandrine torpedo)
  - Family Narcinidae (Gill 1862) (numbfishes)
    - Genus Benthobatis Alcock 1898
      - Benthobatis moresbyi Alcock 1898 (Dark blind ray)
      - Benthobatis marcida Bean & Weed 1909 (Blind torpedo)
      - Benthobatis kreffti Rincón, Stehmann & Vooren 2001 (Brazilian blind electric ray)
      - Benthobatis yangi Carvalho, Compagno & Ebert 2003 (Taiwanese blind electric ray)
    - Genus Diplobatis Bigelow & Schroeder 1948
      - Diplobatis ommata (Jordan & Gildert 1890) (Ocellated electric ray)
      - Diplobatis guamachensis Martín Salazar 1957 (Brownband numbfish)
      - Diplobatis colombiensis Fechhelm & McEachran 1984 (Colombian electric ray)
      - Diplobatis pictus Palmer 1950 (Painted electric ray)
    - Genus Discopyge Heckel ex Tschudi 1846
      - Discopyge tschudii (Heckel 1845) (Apron ray)
      - Discopyge castelloi Menni, Rincón & García 2008
    - Genus Narcine Henle 1834
      - Narcine atzi Carvalho & Randall 2003 (Atz's numbfish)
      - Narcine baliensis de Carvalho & White 2016
      - Narcine bancroftii (Griffith & Smith 1834) (Lesser electric ray)
      - Narcine brasiliensis (Olfers 1831) (Brazilian electric ray)
      - Narcine brevilabiata Besednov 1966 (Short-lip electric ray)
      - Narcine brunnea Annandale 1909 (Brown numbfish)
      - Narcine entemedor Jordan & Starks 1895 (Giant electric ray)
      - Narcine insolita Carvalho, Séret & Compagno 2002 (Madagascar numbfish)
      - Narcine lasti Carvalho & Séret 2002 (Western numbfish)
      - Narcine leoparda Carvalho 2001 (Leopard electric ray)
      - Narcine lingula Richardson 1840 (Chinese numbfish)
      - Narcine maculata (Shaw 1804) (Dark-finned numbfish)
      - Narcine nelsoni Carvalho 2008 (Eastern numbfish)
      - Narcine oculifera de Carvalho, Compagno & Mee 2002 (Big-eye electric ray)
      - Narcine ornata Carvalho 2008 (Ornate numbfish)
      - Narcine prodorsalis Besednov 1966 (Tonkin numbfish)
      - Narcine rierai (Lloris & Rucabado 1991) (Slender electric ray)
      - Narcine tasmaniensis Richardson 1840 (Tasmanian numbfish)
      - Narcine timlei (Bloch & Schneider 1801) (Spotted numbfish)
      - Narcine vermiculata Breder 1928 (Vermiculate electric ray)
      - Narcine westraliensis McKay 1966 (Banded numbfish)
  - Family Narkidae Fowler 1934 (sleeper rays)
    - Genus Crassinarke Takagi 1951
      - Crassinarke dormitor Takagi 1951 (Sleeper torpedo)
    - Genus Electrolux Compagno & Heemstra 2007
      - Electrolux addisoni Compagno & Heemstra 2007 (Ornate sleeper-ray)
    - Genus Heteronarce Regan 1921
      - Heteronarce mollis (Lloyd 1907) (Soft electric ray)
      - Heteronarce garmani Regan 1921 (Natal electric ray)
      - Heteronarce prabhui Talwar 1981 (Quilon electric ray)
      - Heteronarce bentuviai (Baranes & Randall 1989) (Elat electric ray)
    - Genus Narke Kaup 1826
      - Narke capensis (Gmelin 1789) (Onefin electric ray)
      - Narke dipterygia (Bloch & Schneider 1801) (Numbray)
      - Narke japonica (Schengel 1850) (Japanese sleeper ray)
    - Genus Temera Gray 1831
      - Temera hardwickii Gray 1831 (Finless sleeper ray)
    - Genus Typhlonarke Waite 1909
      - Typhlonarke aysoni (Hamilton 1902) (Blind electric ray)
      - Typhlonarke tarakea Phillipps 1929 (Oval electric ray)

==== Order Rhinopristiformes ====
- Suborder Zanobatoidei
  - Family Zanobatidae Fowler 1934 (Striped panray)
    - Genus Zanobatus Garman 1913
      - Zanobatus schoenleinii (Müller & Henle 1841) Garman 1913 (Striped panray)
- Suborder Pristoidei
  - Family Trygonorrhinidae Last, Séret & Naylor 2016
    - Genus Aptychotrema Norman 1926 (shovelnose rays)
      - Aptychotrema rostrata (Shaw 1794) (Eastern shovelnose ray)
      - Aptychotrema timorensis Last 2004 (Spotted shovelnose ray)
      - Aptychotrema vincentiana (Haacke 1885) (Western shovelnose ray)
    - Genus Trygonorrhina Müller & Henle 1838 (fiddler rays)
      - Trygonorrhina dumerilii (Castelnau 1873) (Southern fiddler ray)
      - Trygonorrhina fasciata (Müller & Henle 1841) (Eastern fiddler ray)
      - Trygonorrhina melaleuca (Scott 1954)
    - Genus Zapteryx Jordan & Gilbert 1880
      - Zapteryx brevirostris (Müller & Henle 1841) (Lesser guitarfish)
      - Zapteryx exasperata (Jordan & Gilbert 1880) (Banded guitarfish)
      - Zapteryx xyster Jordan & Evermann 1896 (Witch guitarfish)
  - Family Rhinobatidae Bonaparte 1835 (guitarfishes)
    - Genus Pseudobatos Last et al. 2016
      - Pseudobatos buthi Rutledge, 2019 (Spadenose guitarfish)
      - Pseudobatos glaucostigmus (Jordan & Gilbert 1883) (Speckled guitarfish)
      - Pseudobatos horkelii (Müller & Henle 1841) (Brazilian guitarfish)
      - Pseudobatos lentiginosus (Garman 1880) (Atlantic guitarfish)
      - Pseudobatos leucorhynchus (Günther 1867) (Whitesnout guitarfish)
      - Pseudobatos percellens (Walbaum 1792) (Chola guitarfish)
      - Pseudobatos planiceps (Garman 1880) (Pacific guitarfish)
      - Pseudobatos prahli (Acero & Franke 1995) (Gorgona guitarfish)
      - Pseudobatos productus (Ayres 1854) (Shovelnose guitarfish)
    - Genus Tarsistes Jordan 1919
      - Tarsistes philippii Jordan 1919
    - Genus Acroteriobatus Giltay 1928
      - Acroteriobatus annulatus (Müller & Henle 1841) (lesser guitarfish)
      - Acroteriobatus blochii (Müller & Henle 1841) (Bluntnose guitarfish)
      - Acroteriobatus leucospilus (Norman 1926) (Gray-spotted guitarfish)
      - Acroteriobatus ocellatus (Norman 1926) (speckled guitarfish)
      - Acroteriobatus omanensis Last et al. 2016
      - Acroteriobatus salalah (Randall & Compagno 1995) (Salalah guitarfish)
      - Acroteriobatus variegatus (Nair & Lal Mohan 1973) (Stripenose guitarfish)
      - Acroteriobatus zanzibarensis (Norman 1926) (Zanzibar guitarfish)
    - Genus Rhinobatos Linck 1790
      - Rhinobatos albomaculatus Norman 1930 (White-spotted guitarfish)
      - Rhinobatos annandalei Norman 1926 (Annandale's guitarfish)
      - Rhinobatos borneensis Last, Séret & Naylor 2016
      - Rhinobatos formosensis Norman 1926 (Taiwan guitarfish)
      - Rhinobatos holcorhynchus Norman 1922 (Slender guitarfish)
      - Rhinobatos hynnicephalus Richardson 1846 (Angel fish)
      - Rhinobatos irvinei Norman 1931 (Spineback guitarfish)
      - Rhinobatos jimbaranensis Last, White & Fahmi 2006 (Jimbaran shovelnose ray)
      - Rhinobatos lionotus Norman 1926 (Smoothback guitarfish)
      - Rhinobatos microphthalmus Teng 1959 (Small-eyed guitarfish)
      - Rhinobatos manai White et al. 2016
      - Rhinobatos nudidorsalis Last, Compagno & Nakaya 2004 (Bareback shovelnose ray)
      - Rhinobatos penggali Last, White & Fahmi 2006 (Indonesian shovelnose ray)
      - Rhinobatos petiti Chabanaud 1929 (Madagascar guitarfish)
      - Rhinobatos punctifer Compagno & Randall 1987 (Spotted guitarfish)
      - Rhinobatos rhinobatos (Linnaeus 1758) (Common guitarfish)
      - Rhinobatos sainsburyi Last 2004 (Goldeneye shovelnose)
      - Rhinobatos schlegelii Müller & Henle 1841 (Brown guitarfish)
      - Rhinobatos spinosus Günther 1870 (Spiny guitarfish)
      - Rhinobatos thouiniana (Shaw 1804) (Shaw's shovelnose guitar fish)
      - Rhinobatos whitei Last, Corrigan & Naylor 2014 (Philippine guitarfish)
  - Family Rhinidae Müller & Henle 1841
    - Genus Rhynchorhina Séret & Naylor 2016
      - Rhynchorhina mauritaniensis Séret & Naylor 2016
    - Genus Rhina Bloch & Schneider 1801
      - Rhina ancylostoma Bloch & Schneider 1801 (Bowmouth guitarfish)
    - Genus Rhynchobatus Müller & Henle 1837 (Wedgefishes)
      - Rhynchobatus australiae Whitley 1939 (White-spotted wedgefish)
      - Rhynchobatus djiddensis (Forsskål 1775) (Giant guitarfish)
      - Rhynchobatus immaculatus Last, Ho & Chen 2013 (Taiwanese wedgefish)
      - Rhynchobatus laevis (Bloch & Schneider 1801) (Smooth nose wedgefish)
      - Rhynchobatus luebberti Ehrenbaum 1915 (African wedgefish)
      - Rhynchobatus palpebratus Compagno & Last 2008 (Eyebrow wedgefish)
      - Rhynchobatus springeri Compagno & Last 2010 (Broadnose wedgefish)
  - Family Pristidae (Sawfish or carpenter sharks)
    - Genus Anoxypristis White & Moy-Thomas 1941
      - Anoxypristis cuspidata (Latham, 1794) White & Moy-Thomas 1941 (Knifetooth sawfish or pointed sawfish)
    - Genus Pristis Linck 1790
      - Pristis clavata Garman, 1906 (Queensland sawfish or dwarf sawfish)
      - Pristis pectinata Latham, 1794 (Smalltooth sawfish)
      - Pristis pristis (Linnaeus, 1758) (Common large-tooth sawfish)
      - Pristis zijsron Bleeker, 1851 (Longcomb sawfish)
  - Family Glaucostegidae Last, Séret & Naylor 2016 (giant guitarfishes)
    - Genus Glaucostegus Bonaparte 1846
      - Glaucostegus cemiculus (Geoffroy St. Hilaire 1817) (Blackchin guitarfish)
      - Glaucostegus granulatus Cuvier 1829 (Granulated guitarfish)
      - Glaucostegus halavi (Forsskål 1775) (Halavi ray)
      - Glaucostegus obtusus (Müller & Henle 1841) (Widenose guitarfish)
      - Glaucostegus thouin Anonymous [Bennett] 1798 (Thouin ray)
      - Glaucostegus typus (Bennett 1830) (Giant shovelnose ray)

==== Order Rajiformes ====
- Family Gurgesiellidae Buen 1959 (pygmy skates)
  - Tribe Gurgesiellini
    - Genus Gurgesiella de Buen 1959 (Small deep-water skates)
      - Gurgesiella atlantica (Bigelow & Schroeder 1962) (Atlantic pygmy skate)
      - Gurgesiella dorsalifera McEachran 1980 (Onefin skate)
      - Gurgesiella furvescens de Buen 1959 (Dusky finless skate)
  - Tribe Crurirajini
    - Genus Cruriraja Bigelow & Schroeder 1948 (leg skates)
      - Cruriraja andamanica (Lloyd 1909) (Andaman leg skate)
      - Cruriraja atlantis Bigelow & Schroeder 1948 (Atlantic leg skate)
      - Cruriraja cadenati Bigelow & Schroeder 1962 (Broadfoot leg skate)
      - Cruriraja durbanensis (von Bonde & Swart 1922) (Smoothnose leg skate)
      - Cruriraja hulleyi Aschliman, Ebert & Compagno 2010
      - Cruriraja parcomaculata (von Bonde & Swart 1922) (Roughnose leg skate)
      - Cruriraja poeyi Bigelow & Schroeder 1948 (Cuban leg skate)
      - Cruriraja rugosa Bigelow & Schroeder 1958 (Rough leg skate)
    - Genus Fenestraja (McEachran & Compagno 1982) (Pygmy skates)
      - Fenestraja atripinna (Bigelow & Schroeder 1950) (Blackfin pygmy skate)
      - Fenestraja cubensis (Bigelow & Schroeder 1950) (Cuban pygmy skate)
      - Fenestraja ishiyamai (Bigelow & Schroeder 1950) (Plain pygmy skate)
      - Fenestraja maceachrani (Seret 1989) (Madagascar pygmy skate)
      - Fenestraja mamillidens (Alcock 1889) (Prickly skate)
      - Fenestraja plutonia (Garman 1881) (Pluto skate)
      - Fenestraja sibogae (Weber 1913) (Siboga skate)
      - Fenestraja sinusmexicanus (Bigelow & Schroeder 1950) (Gulf of Mexico pygmy skate)
- Family Anacanthobatidae (Smooth skates)
  - Genus Anacanthobatis von Bonde & Swart 1923
    - Anacanthobatis americana Bigelow & Schroeder 1962 (American leg skate)
    - Anacanthobatis donghaiensis (Deng, Xiong & Zhan 1983) (East China leg skate)
    - Anacanthobatis folirostris (Bigelow & Schroeder 1951) (Leaf-nose leg skate)
    - Anacanthobatis longirostris Bigelow & Schroeder 1962 (Longnose leg skate)
    - Anacanthobatis marmorata (von Bonde & Swart 1923) (Spotted legskate)
    - Anacanthobatis nanhaiensis (Meng & Li 1981) (South China leg skate)
  - Genus Indobatis Weigmann, Stehmann & Thiel 2014
    - Indobatis ori (Wallace 1967) Weigmann, Stehmann & Thiel 2014 (Black legskate)
  - Genus Sinobatis (Hulley 1973) (Indopacific smooth skates)
    - Sinobatis andamanensis Last & Bussarawit 2016
    - Sinobatis borneensis (Chan 1965) (Borneo legskate)
    - Sinobatis brevicauda Weigmann & Stehmann 2016 (Short-tail legskate)
    - Sinobatis bulbicauda Last & Séret 2008 (Western Australian legskate)
    - Sinobatis caerulea Last & Séret 2008 (Blue legskate)
    - Sinobatis filicauda Last & Séret 2008 (Eastern Australian legskate)
    - Sinobatis kotlyari Stehmann & Weigmann 2016
    - Sinobatis melanosoma (Chan 1965) (Black-bodied legskate)
    - Sinobatis stenosoma (Li & Hu 1982) (Narrow leg skate)
- Family Arhynchobatidae Fowler 1934 (longtail skates)
  - Subfamily Riorajinae
    - Genus Atlantoraja (Menni 1972) (Southern South American skates)
      - Atlantoraja castelnaui (Ribeiro 1904) (Spotback skate)
      - Atlantoraja cyclophora (Regan 1903) (Eyespot skate)
      - Atlantoraja platana (Gunther 1880) (La Plata skate)
    - Genus Rioraja (Müller & Henle 1841) Whitley 1939
      - Rioraja agassizii (Müller & Henle 1841) Whitley 1939 (Rio skate)
  - Subfamily Arhynchobatinae
    - Tribe Arhynchobatini
      - Genus Psammobatis Günther 1870 (Sand skates)
        - Psammobatis bergi Marini 1932 (Blotched sand skate)
        - Psammobatis extenta (Garman 1913) (Zipper sand skate)
        - Psammobatis lentiginosa McEachran 1983 (Freckled sand skate)
        - Psammobatis normani McEachran 1983 (Shortfin sand skate)
        - Psammobatis parvacauda McEachran 1983 (Smalltail sand skate)
        - Psammobatis rudis Gunther 1870 (Smallthorn sand skate)
        - Psammobatis rutra Jordan 1890 (Spade sand skate)
        - Psammobatis scobina (Phillipi 1857) (Raspthorn sand skate)
      - Genus Sympterygia Müller & Henle 1837 (fanskates)
        - Sympterygia lima (Poeppig 1835) (Filetail fanskate)
        - Sympterygia bonapartei Müller & Henle 1841 (Smallnose fanskate)
        - Sympterygia acuta Garman 1877 (Bignose fanskate)
        - Sympterygia brevicaudata (Cope 1877) (Shorttail fanskate)
      - Genus Arhynchobatis Waite 1909 (Longtail skate)
        - Arhynchobatis asperrima Waite 1909 (Longtail skate)
      - Genus Irolita Whitley 1931 (Round skates)
        - Irolita waitii (McCulloch 1911) (Southern round skate)
        - Irolita westraliensis Last & Gledhill 2008 (Western round skate)
    - Tribe Bathyrajini Last, Weigmann & Yang 2016
      - Genus Bathyraja (Ishiyama 1958)
        - Bathyraja abyssicola (Deepsea skate)
        - Bathyraja aguja (Aguja skate)
        - Bathyraja albomaculata (White-dotted skate)
        - Bathyraja aleutica (Aleutian skate)
        - Bathyraja andriashevi (Little-eyed skate)
        - Bathyraja bergi (Bottom skate)
        - Bathyraja brachyurops (Broadnose skate)
        - Bathyraja caeluronigricans (Purple-black skate)
        - Bathyraja cousseauae (Joined-fins skate)
        - Bathyraja dilpotaenia (Dusty-pink skate)
        - Bathyraja eatonii (Eaton's skate)
        - Bathyraja fedorovi (Cinnamon skate)
        - Bathyraja griseocauda (Graytail skate)
        - Bathyraja hesperafricana (West African skate)
        - Bathyraja interrupta (Sandpaper skate)
        - Bathyraja irrasa (Kerguelen sandpaper skate)
        - Bathyraja ishiharai
        - Bathyraja isotrachys (Raspback skate)
        - Bathyraja leucomelanos (Domino skate)
        - Bathyraja lindbergi (Commander skate)
        - Bathyraja longicauda (Slimtail skate)
        - Bathyraja maccaini (McCain's skate)
        - Bathyraja macloviana (Patagonian skate)
        - Bathyraja maculata (White-blotched skate)
        - Bathyraja magellanica (Magellan skate)
        - Bathyraja mariposa (Butterfly skate)
        - Bathyraja matsubarai (Dusky-purple skate)
        - Bathyraja meridionalis (Dark-belly skate)
        - Bathyraja murrayi (Smallthorn skate)
        - Bathyraja multispinis (Multispine skate)
        - Bathyraja notoroensis (Notoro skate)
        - Bathyraja pallida (Pale skate)
        - Bathyraja panthera (Leopard skate)
        - Bathyraja papilionifera
        - Bathyraja parmifera (Alaska skate)
        - Bathyraja peruana (Peruvian skate)
        - Bathyraja richardsoni (Richardson's ray)
        - Bathyraja scaphiops (Cuphead skate)
        - Bathyraja schroederi (Whitemouth skate)
        - Bathyraja shuntovi (Longnose deep-sea skate)
        - Bathyraja simoterus (Hokkaido skate)
        - Bathyraja smirnovi (Golden skate)
        - Bathyraja smithii (African softnose skate)
        - Bathyraja spinicauda (Spinytail skate)
        - Bathyraja spinosissima (Pacific white skate)
        - Bathyraja trachouros (Eremo skate)
        - Bathyraja taranetzi
        - Bathyraja trachura (Roughtail skate)
        - Bathyraja tunae
        - Bathyraja tzinovskii (Creamback skate)
        - Bathyraja violacea (Okhotsk skate)
      - Genus Rhinoraja Ishiyama 1952 (jointnose skates)
        - Rhinoraja kujiensis (Tanaka 1916) (Dapple-bellied softnose skate)
        - Rhinoraja longicauda Ishiyama 1952 (White-bellied softnose skate)
        - Rhinoraja odai Ishiyama 1958 (Oda's skate)
    - Tribe Pavorajini McEachran 1984
      - Genus Brochiraja Last & McEachran 2006 (Deep-sea skates)
        - Brochiraja aenigma (Enigma skate)
        - Brochiraja albilabiata
        - Brochiraja asperula (Spiny deepsea skate)
        - Brochiraja heuresa
        - Brochiraja leviveneta
        - Brochiraja microspinifera
        - Brochiraja spinifera (Prickly deepsea skate)
        - Brochiraja vittacauda
      - Genus Insentiraja (Yearsley & Last 1992) (Pacific looseskin skates)
        - Insentiraja laxipella (Eastern looseskin skate)
        - Insentiraja subtilispinosa (Velvet skate)
      - Genus Notoraja (Ishiyama 1958) (Indian/Pacific softnose skates)
        - Notoraja alisae (Alis skate)
        - Notoraja azurea (Blue-skate)
        - Notoraja fijiensis (Fiji skate)
        - Notoraja hirticauda (False ghost skate)
        - Notoraja inusitata (Strange skate)
        - Notoraja lira (Broken Ridge skate)
        - Notoraja longiventralis (Long-ventral skate)
        - Notoraja martinezi (Barbedwire-tailed skate)
        - Notoraja ochroderma (Pale skate)
        - Notoraja sapphira (Sapphire skate)
        - Notoraja sticta (Blotched skate)
        - Notoraja tobitukai (Lead-hued skate)
      - Genus Pavoraja Whitley 1939 (Peacock skates)
        - Pavoraja alleni (Allen's skate)
        - Pavoraja arenaria (Sandy skate)
        - Pavoraja mosaica (Mosaic skate)
        - Pavoraja nitida (Peacock skate)
        - Pavoraja pseudonitida (False peacock skate)
        - Pavoraja umbrosa (Dusky skate)
      - Genus Pseudoraja Bigelow & Schroeder 1954
        - Pseudoraja atlantica
        - Pseudoraja fischeri (Fanfin skate)
- Family Rajidae: "True" skates
  - Genus Malacobatis Gratzianov 1907
    - Malacobatis mucosa (Steller 1814) Gratzianov 1907
  - Tribe Rostrorajini Ishihara et al. 2012
    - Genus Malacoraja (Stehmann 1970) (Soft skates)
      - Malacoraja kreffti (Krefft's skate)
      - Malacoraja obscura (Brazilian soft skate)
      - Malacoraja senta
      - Malacoraja spinacidermis (Soft skate)
    - Genus Neoraja McEachran & Campagno 1982 (Blue pygmy skates)
      - Neoraja africana (West African pygmy skate)
      - Neoraja caerulea (Blue pygmy skate)
      - Neoraja carolinensis (Carolina pygmy skate)
      - Neoraja iberica (Iberian pygmy skate)
      - Neoraja stehmanni (African dwarf skate)
    - Genus Orbiraja Last, Weigman & Dumale 2016
      - Orbiraja jensenae (Last & Lim 2010) Last, Weigmann & Dumale 2016 (Sulu sea skate)
      - Orbiraja philipi (Lloyd 1906)
      - Orbiraja powelli (Alcock 1898) (Indian ringed skate)
    - Genus Rostroraja (Hulley 1972)
      - Rostroraja ackleyi (Garman 1881) (Ocellate skate)
      - Rostroraja alba (Lacépède 1802) Hulley 1972 (Bottlenose skate)
      - Rostroraja bahamensis (Bigelow & Schroeder 1965) (Bahama skate)
      - Rostroraja cervigoni (Bigelow & Schroeder 1964) (Finspot ray)
      - Rostroraja eglanteria (Bosc 1800) (clearnose skate)
      - Rostroraja equatorialis (Jordan & Bollman 1890) (equatorial ray)
      - Rostroraja texana (Chandler 1921) (Roundel skate)
      - Rostroraja velezi (Chirichigno 1973) (Velez ray)
  - Tribe Amblyrajini McEachran & Dunn 1998
    - Genus Amblyraja Malm 1877 (Thorny skates and others)
      - Amblyraja badia (Broad skate)
      - Amblyraja doellojuradoi (Southern thorny skate)
      - Amblyraja frerichsi (Thickbody skate)
      - Amblyraja georgiana (Antarctic starry skate)
      - Amblyraja hyperborea (Arctic skate)
      - Amblyraja jenseni (Jensen's skate or shorttail skate)
      - Amblyraja radiata (Thorny skate)
      - Amblyraja reversa (Reversed skate)
      - Amblyraja robertsi (Bigmouth skate)
      - Amblyraja taaf (Whiteleg skate)
    - Genus Breviraja Bigelow & Schroeder 1948
      - Breviraja claramaculata (Brightspot skate)
      - Breviraja colesi (Lightnose skate)
      - Breviraja mouldi (Blacknose skate)
      - Breviraja nigriventralis (Blackbelly skate)
      - Breviraja spinosa (Spinose skate)
    - Genus Dactylobatus Bean & Weed 1909 (Skilletskate and hookskate)
      - Dactylobatus armatus (Skilletskate)
      - Dactylobatus clarkii (Hookskate)
    - Genus Leucoraja Malm 1877 (Rough skates)
      - Leucoraja caribbaea (Maya skate)
      - Leucoraja circularis (Sandy skate)
      - Leucoraja compagnoi (Tigertail skate)
      - Leucoraja erinacea (Little skate)
      - Leucoraja fullonica (Shagreen skate)
      - Leucoraja garmani (Freckled skate)
      - Leucoraja lentiginosa (Speckled skate)
      - Leucoraja leucosticta (Whitedappled skate)
      - Leucoraja melitensis (Maltese skate)
      - Leucoraja naevus (Cuckoo skate)
      - Leucoraja ocellata (Winter skate)
      - Leucoraja pristispina (Sawback skate)
      - Leucoraja virginica (Virginia skate)
      - Leucoraja wallacei (Yellow-spotted skate)
      - Leucoraja yucatanensis (Yucatan skate)
    - Genus Rajella (Stehmann 1972)
      - Rajella fyllae (Lütken 1887) (Nova Scotia/round ray)
      - Rajella lintea (Fries 1838) (Sailray)
      - Rajella bathyphila (Holt & Byrne 1908) (Deep-water ray)
      - Rajella annandalei (Weber 1913) (Annandale's skate)
      - Rajella caudaspinosa (von Bonde & Swart 1923) (Munchkin skate)
      - Rajella leoparda (von Bonde & Swart 1923) (Leopard skate)
      - Rajella barnardi (Norman 1935) (Bigthorn skate)
      - Rajella fuliginea (Bigelow & Schroeder 1954) (Sooty skate)
      - Rajella nigerrima (de Buen 1960) (Blackish skate)
      - Rajella purpuriventralis (Bigelow & Schroeder 1962) (Purplebelly skate)
      - Rajella dissimilis (Hulley 1970) (Ghost skate)
      - Rajella ravidula (Hulley 1970) (Smoothback skate)
      - Rajella sadowskii (Krefft & Stehmann 1974) (Brazilian skate)
      - Rajella bigelowi (Stehmann 1978) (Bigelow's ray)
      - Rajella kukujevi (Dolganov 1985) (Mid-Atlantic Skate)
      - Rajella eisenhardti Long & McCosker 1999 (Galápagos grey skate)
      - Rajella challengeri Last & Stehmann 2008 (Challenger Skate)
      - Rajella paucispinosa Weigmann, Stehmann & Thiel 2014 (Sparsely-thorned skate)
  - Tribe Rajini
    - Genus Dentiraja
      - Dentiraja australis (Sydney skate)
      - Dentiraja cerva (White-spotted skate)
      - Dentiraja confusus (Longnose skate - this common name is also sometimes used for Beringraja rhina)
      - Dentiraja endeavouri (Endeavour skate)
      - Dentiraja falloargus (False Argus skate)
      - Dentiraja flindersi (Pygmy thornback skate)
      - Dentiraja healdi (Heald's skate)
      - Dentiraja lemprieri (Thornback skate)
      - Dentiraja oculus (Ocellate skate)
      - Dentiraja polyommata (Argus skate)
    - Genus Dipturus (Larger common skates)
      - Dipturus acrobelus (Deepwater skate)
      - Dipturus amphispinus (Ridgeback skate)
      - Dipturus apricus (Pale tropical skate)
      - Dipturus batis (Common skate, or blue skate)
      - Dipturus bullisi (Bullis skate)
      - Dipturus campbelli (Blackspot skate)
      - Dipturus canutus (Gray skate)
      - Dipturus crosnieri (Madagascar skate)
      - Dipturus diehli (Thorny-tail skate)
      - Dipturus doutrei (Violet skate)
      - Dipturus ecuadoriensis (Ecuador skate)
      - Dipturus flavirostris
      - Dipturus garricki (San Blas skate)
      - Dipturus gigas (Giant skate)
      - Dipturus grahami (Graham's skate)
      - Dipturus gudgeri (Greenback skate)
      - Dipturus innominatus (New Zealand smooth skate)
      - Dipturus johannisdavisi (Travancore skate)
      - Dipturus kwangtungensis (Kwangtung skate)
      - Dipturus laevis (Barndoor skate)
      - Dipturus lanceorostratus (Rattail skate)
      - Dipturus leptocauda (Thintail skate)
      - Dipturus macrocauda (Bigtail skate)
      - Dipturus melanospilus (Blacktip skate)
      - Dipturus mennii (South Brazilian skate)
      - Dipturus nidarosiensis (Norwegian skate)
      - Dipturus olseni (Spreadfin skate)
      - Dipturus oregoni (Hooktail skate)
      - Dipturus oxyrinchus
      - Dipturus pullopunctatus (Slimeskate)
      - Dipturus queenslandicus (Queensland deepwater skate)
      - Dipturus springeri (Roughbelly skate)
      - Dipturus stenorhynchus (Prownose skate)
      - Dipturus teevani (Prickly brown ray)
      - Dipturus tengu (Acutenose skate)
      - Dipturus trachyderma (Roughskin skate)
      - Dipturus wengi (Weng's skate)
      - Dipturus whitleyi (Wedgenose skate)
      - Dipturus wuhanlingi (Wu's skate)
    - Genus Beringraja Ishihara et al. 2012 [Raja “North Pacific Assemblage”]
      - Beringraja binoculata (Girard 1855) (Big skate)
      - Beringraja pulchra (Liu 1932) (Mottled skate)
      - Beringraja corteziensis (McEachran & Miyake 1988)
      - Beringraja inornata (Jordan & Gilbert 1880)
      - Beringraja rhina (Jordan & Gilbert 1880) (Longnose skate this common name is also sometimes used for Dentiraja confusus)
      - Beringraja stellulata (Jordan & Gilbert 1880)
    - Genus Hongeo
      - Hongeo koreana (Korean skate)
    - Genus Okamejei (includes spot skates)
      - Okamejei acutispina (Sharpspine skate)
      - Okamejei arafurensis (Arafura skate)
      - Okamejei boesemani (Boeseman's skate)
      - Okamejei cairae (Borneo sand skate)
      - Okamejei heemstrai (East African skate)
      - Okamejei hollandi (Yellow-spotted skate)
      - Okamejei kenojei (Ocellate spot skate, or spiny rasp skate)
      - Okamejei leptoura (Thin-tail skate)
      - Okamejei meerdervoortii (Bigeye skate)
      - Okamejei mengae
      - Okamejei ornata (Ornate skate)
      - Okamejei pita (Pita skate)
      - Okamejei schmidti (Browneye skate)
    - Genus Raja
      - Raja africana Capapé, 1977 (African skate)
      - Raja asterias Delaroche, 1809 (Mediterranean starry ray)
      - Raja brachyura Lafont, 1873 (blonde ray)
      - Raja clavata Linnaeus, 1758 (thornback ray)
      - Raja herwigi G. Krefft, 1965 (Cape Verde skate)
      - Raja maderensis R. T. Lowe, 1838 (Madeiran ray)
      - Raja microocellata Montagu, 1818 (small-eyed ray)
      - Raja miraletus Linnaeus, 1758 (brown ray)
      - Raja montagui Fowler, 1910 (spotted ray)
      - Raja parva Last & Séret, 2016 (African brown skate)
      - Raja polystigma Regan, 1923 (speckled ray)
      - Raja radula Delaroche, 1809 (rough ray)
      - Raja rondeleti Bougis, 1959 (Rondelet's ray)
      - Raja rouxi Capapé, 1977
      - Raja straeleni Poll, 1951 (spotted skate)
      - Raja undulata Lacépède, 1802 (undulate ray)
    - Genus Zearaja Whitley 1939
      - Zearaja argentinensis (Díaz de Astarloa et al. 2008) (Argentine skate)
      - Zearaja nasuta (Müller & Henle 1841) (New Zealand rough skate)
      - Zearaja maugeana Last & Gledhill 2007 (Maugean skate)

==== Order Myliobatiformes ====
- Suborder Myliobatoidei: Stingrays, eagle rays, cownose rays, and butterfly rays
  - Family Dasyatidae: Whiptail stingrays
    - Genus Bathytoshia
      - Bathytoshia brevicaudata (Short-tail stingray)
      - Bathytoshia centroura (Roughtail stingray)
      - Bathytoshia lata (Broad stingray)
    - Genus Brevitrygon
      - Brevitrygon heterura (Dwarf whipray)
      - Brevitrygon imbricata (Bengal whipray)
      - Brevitrygon javaensis (Javan whipray)
      - Brevitrygon walga (Scaly whipray)
    - Genus Dasyatis: Rough stingrays
      - Dasyatis chrysonota (Blue stingray)
      - Dasyatis gigantea (Giant stumptail stingray)
      - Dasyatis hypostigma (Groovebelly stingray)
      - Dasyatis marmorata (Marbled stingray)
      - Dasyatis pastinaca (Common stingray)
      - Dasyatis tortonesei (Tortonese's stingray)
    - Genus Fontitrygon
      - Fontitrygon colarensis (Colares stingray)
      - Fontitrygon garouaensis (Smooth freshwater stingray)
      - Fontitrygon geijskesi (Sharpsnout stingray)
      - Fontitrygon margarita (Daisy stingray)
      - Fontitrygon margaritella (Pearl stingray)
      - Fontitrygon ukpam (Pincushion ray)
    - Genus Fluvitrygon
      - Fluvitrygon kittipongi (Roughback whipray)
      - Fluvitrygon oxyrhyncha (Marbled whipray)
      - Fluvitrygon signifer (White-edge freshwater whipray)
    - Genus Hemitrygon
      - Hemitrygon akajei (Red stingray)
      - Hemitrygon bennetti (Bennett's stingray)
      - Hemitrygon fluviorum (Estuary stingray)
      - Hemitrygon izuensis (Izu stingray)
      - Hemitrygon laevigata (Yantai stingray)
      - Hemitrygon laosensis (Mekong freshwater stingray)
      - Hemitrygon longicauda (Merauke stingray)
      - Hemitrygon navarrae (Blackish stingray)
      - Hemitrygon parvonigra (Dwarf black stingray)
      - Hemitrygon sinensis (Chinese stingray)
    - Genus Himantura: Whiprays
      - Himantura alcockii (Pale-spot whip ray)
      - Himantura australis (Australian whipray)
      - Himantura fava (honeycomb whipray)
      - Himantura fluviatilis (Ganges stingray)
      - Himantura krempfi (Marbled freshwater whip ray)
      - Himantura leoparda (Leopard whipray)
      - Himantura marginata (Blackedge whipray)
      - Himantura microphthalma (Smalleye whipray)
      - Himantura pareh
      - Himantura tutul (Fine-spotted leopard whipray)
      - Himantura uarnak (Reticulate whipray)
      - Himantura undulata (Honeycomb whipray)
    - Genus Hypanus
      - Hypanus americanus (Southern stingray)
      - Hypanus dipterurus (Diamond stingray)
      - Hypanus guttatus (Longnose stingray)
      - Hypanus longus (Longtail stingray)
      - Hypanus marianae (Brazilian large-eyed stingray)
      - Hypanus rudis (Smalltooth stingray)
      - Hypanus sabinus (Atlantic stingray)
      - Hypanus say (Bluntnose stingray)
    - Genus Maculabatis
      - Maculabatis astra (Black-spotted whipray)
      - Maculabatis gerrardi (Whitespotted whipray)
      - Maculabatis pastinacoides (Round whipray)
      - Maculabatis randalli (Arabian banded whipray)
      - Maculabatis toshi (Brown whipray)
    - Genus Makararaja
      - Makararaja chindwinensis (Chindwin cowtail ray)
    - Genus Megatrygon: Smalleye stingray
      - Megatrygon microps (Smalleye stingray)
    - Genus Neotrygon: Maskrays
      - Neotrygon annotata (Plain maskray)
      - Neotrygon kuhlii (Kuhl's maskray)
      - Neotrygon leylandi (Painted maskray)
      - Neotrygon ningalooensis (Ningaloo maskray)
      - Neotrygon picta (Peppered maskray)
      - Neotrygon trigonoides (New Caledonian maskray)
    - Genus Pastinachus: Cowtail stingrays
      - Pastinachus atrus (Eastern cowtail stingray)
      - Pastinachus gracilicaudus (Narrowtail stingray)
      - Pastinachus sephen (Cowtail stingray)
      - Pastinachus solocirostris (Roughnose stingray)
    - Genus Pateobatis
      - Pateobatis bleekeri (Bleeker's whipray)
      - Pateobatis fai (Pink whipray)
      - Pateobatis hortlei (Hortle's whipray)
      - Pateobatis jenkinsii (Jenkins' whipray)
      - Pateobatis uarnacoides (Whitenose whipray)
    - Genus Pteroplatytrygon: Pelagic stingray
      - Pteroplatytrygon violacea (Pelagic stingray)
    - Genus Taeniura: Ribbontail stingrays
      - Taeniura grabata (Round fantail stingray)
      - Taeniura lymma (Bluespotted ribbontail ray)
      - Taeniura meyeni (Round ribbontail ray)
    - Genus Telatrygon: Sharpnose rays
      - Telatrygon acutirostra (Sharpnose stingray)
      - Telatrygon bias (Indonesian sharpnose ray)
      - Telatrygon crozieri (Indian sharpnose ray)
      - Telatrygon zugei (Pale-edged stingray)
    - Genus Urogymnus: Porcupine ray
      - Urogymnus asperrimus (Porcupine ray)
      - Urogymnus dalyensis (Freshwater whipray)
      - Urogymnus granulata (Mangrove whipray)
      - Urogymnus lobistoma (Tubemouth whipray)
      - Urogymnus polylepis (Giant freshwater stingray)
  - Family Gymnuridae: Butterfly rays
    - Genus Gymnura: Butterfly rays
      - Gymnura afuerae (Peruvian butterfly ray)
      - Gymnura altavela (Spiny butterfly ray)
      - Gymnura australis (Australian butterfly ray)
      - Gymnura bimaculata (Twin-spot butterfly ray)
      - Gymnura crebripunctata (Longspout butterfly ray)
      - Gymnura crooki
      - Gymnura hirrundo (Madeira butterfly ray)
      - Gymnura japonica (Japanese butterfly ray)
      - Gymnura marmorata (California butterfly ray)
      - Gymnura micrura (Smooth butterfly ray)
      - Gymnura natalensis (Backwater butterfly ray)
      - Gymnura poecilura (Longtail butterfly ray)
      - Gymnura tentaculata (Tentacled butterfly ray)
      - Gymnura zonura (Zonetail butterfly ray)
  - Family Hexatrygonidae: Sixgill stingray
    - Genus Hexatrygon
      - Hexatrygon bickelli (Sixgill stingray)
  - Family Myliobatidae: Eagle rays and manta rays
    - Genus Aetobatus
      - Aetobatus flagellum (Longheaded eagle ray)
      - Aetobatus narinari (Spotted eagle ray)
      - Aetobatus narutobiei (Naru eagle ray)
      - Aetobatus ocellatus (Ocellated eagle ray)
    - Genus Aetomylaeus: Stingless eagle rays
      - Aetomylaeus asperrimus (Rough eagle ray)
      - Aetomylaeus bovinus (Bull ray)
      - Aetomylaeus caeruleofasciatus
      - Aetomylaeus maculatus (Mottled eagle ray)
      - Aetomylaeus milvus (Brown eagle ray)
      - Aetomylaeus nichofii (Banded eagle ray)
      - Aetomylaeus vespertilio (Ornate eagle ray)
      - Aetomylaeus wafickii (Wafic's eagle ray)
    - Genus Manta: Manta rays
      - Manta alfredi (Reef manta ray)
      - Manta birostris (Giant oceanic manta ray)
    - Genus Mobula: Devil rays
      - Mobula eregoodootenkee (Pygmy devil ray)
      - Mobula hypostoma (Lesser devil ray)
      - Mobula japanica (Spinetail mobula)
      - Mobula kuhlii (Shortfin devil ray)
      - Mobula mobular (Devil fish)
      - Mobula munkiana (Monk's devil ray)
      - Mobula rochebrunei (Guinean devil ray)
      - Mobula tarapacana (Box ray)
      - Mobula thurstoni (Bentfin devil ray)
    - Genus Myliobatis: Eagle rays (in part)
      - Myliobatis aquila (Common eagle ray)
      - Myliobatis australis (Australian bull ray)
      - Myliobatis californica (Bat ray)
      - Myliobatis chilensis (Chilean eagle ray)
      - Myliobatis freminvillei (Bullnose ray)
      - Myliobatis goodei (Southern eagle ray)
      - Myliobatis hamlyni (Purple eagle ray)
      - Myliobatis longirostris (Longnose eagle ray, or snouted eagle ray)
      - Myliobatis peruvianus (Peruvian eagle ray)
      - Myliobatis ridens (Shortnose eagle ray)
      - Myliobatis tenuicaudatus (New Zealand eagle ray)
      - Myliobatis tobijei (Japanese eagle ray)
  - Family Plesiobatidae: Deepwater stingray
    - Genus Plesiobatis
      - Plesiobatis daviesi (Deepwater stingray)
  - Family Potamotrygonidae: Freshwater stingrays
    - Genus Heliotrygon: Round river stingrays
      - Heliotrygon gomesi (Gomes's round ray)
      - Heliotrygon rosai (Rosa's round ray)
    - Genus Paratrygon
      - Paratrygon aiereba (Discus ray)
      - Paratrygon orinocensis Loboda, Lasso, Rosa & De Carvalho, 2021
      - Paratrygon parvaspina Loboda, Lasso, Rosa & De Carvalho, 2021
    - Genus Plesiotrygon: Antenna rays
      - Plesiotrygon iwamae (Long-tailed river stingray)
      - Plesiotrygon nana (Black-tailed antenna ray)
    - Genus Potamotrygon: Common river stingrays
      - Potamotrygon adamastor Fontenelle, J. P. & de Carvalho, M. R., 2017 (Branco river stingray)
      - Potamotrygon albimaculata M. R. de Carvalho, 2016 (Itaituba river stingray or Tapajós river stingray)
      - Potamotrygon amandae Loboda & M. R. de Carvalho, 2013 (Amanda's river stingray)
      - Potamotrygon amazona Fontenelle, J. P. & de Carvalho, M. R., 2017 (Upper Amazon raspy river stingray)
      - Potamotrygon boesemani (Emperor ray)
      - Potamotrygon brachyura (Short-tailed river stingray)
      - Potamotrygon constellata (Thorny river stingray)
      - Potamotrygon falkneri (Largespot river stingray)
      - Potamotrygon garmani Fontenelle, J. P. & de Carvalho, M. R., 2017 (Garman's river stingray)
      - Potamotrygon henlei (Bigtooth river stingray)
      - Potamotrygon humerosa
      - Potamotrygon hystrix (Porcupine river stingray)
      - Potamotrygon leopoldi (Xingu River ray, or white-blotched river stingray)
      - Potamotrygon limai
      - Potamotrygon magdalenae (Magdalena river stingray)
      - Potamotrygon marinae
      - Potamotrygon motoro (Ocellate river stingray)
      - Potamotrygon ocellata (Red-blotched river stingray)
      - Potamotrygon orbignyi (Smooth back river stingray)
      - Potamotrygon pantanensis
      - Potamotrygon schroederi (Rosette river stingray)
      - Potamotrygon schuhmacheri (Parana River stingray)
      - Potamotrygon scobina (Raspy river stingray)
      - Potamotrygon signata (Parnaiba river stingray)
      - Potamotrygon tatianae (Tatiana's river stingray)
      - Potamotrygon tigrina (Tiger ray)
      - Potamotrygon yepezi (Maracaibo River ray)
    - Genus Styracura: Chupares
      - Styracura pacifica (Pacific chupare, or Pacific whiptail stingray)
      - Styracura schmardae (Chupare stingray)
  - Family Rhinopteridae: Cownose rays
    - Genus Rhinoptera: Cownose rays
      - Rhinoptera adspersa (Rough cownose ray)
      - Rhinoptera bonasus (Common cownose ray)
      - Rhinoptera brasiliensis (Brazilian cownose ray)
      - Rhinoptera javanica (Flapnose ray)
      - Rhinoptera jayakari (Oman cownose ray)
      - Rhinoptera marginata (Lusitanian cownose ray)
      - Rhinoptera neglecta (Australian cownose ray)
      - Rhinoptera steindachneri (Pacific cownose ray)
  - Family Urolophidae: Stingarees
    - Genus Trygonoptera: Australian stingarees
      - Trygonoptera galba (Yellow shovelnose stingaree)
      - Trygonoptera imitata (Eastern shovelnose stingaree)
      - Trygonoptera mucosa (Western shovelnose stingaree)
      - Trygonoptera ovalis (Striped stingaree)
      - Trygonoptera personata (Masked stingaree)
      - Trygonoptera testacea (Common stingaree)
    - Genus Urolophus: Western Pacific stingarees
      - Urolophus armatus (New Ireland stingaree)
      - Urolophus aurantiacus (Sepia stingaree)
      - Urolophus bucculentus (Sandyback stingaree)
      - Urolophus circularis (Circular stingaree)
      - Urolophus cruciatus (Crossback stingaree)
      - Urolophus deforgesi (Chesterfield Island stingaree)
      - Urolophus expansus (Wide stingaree)
      - Urolophus flavomosaicus (Patchwork stingaree)
      - Urolophus gigas (Spotted stingaree)
      - Urolophus javanicus (Java stingaree)
      - Urolophus kaianus (Kai stingaree)
      - Urolophus kapalensis (Kapala stingaree)
      - Urolophus lobatus (Lobed stingaree)
      - Urolophus mitosis (Mitotic stingaree)
      - Urolophus neocaledoniensis (New Caledonian stingaree)
      - Urolophus orarius (Coastal stingaree)
      - Urolophus papilio (Butterfly stingaree)
      - Urolophus paucimaculatus (Sparsely-spotted stingaree)
      - Urolophus piperatus (Coral sea stingaree)
      - Urolophus sufflavus (Yellowback stingaree)
      - Urolophus viridis (Greenback stingaree)
      - Urolophus westraliensis (Brown stingaree)
  - Family Urotrygonidae: American round stingrays
    - Genus Urobatis: Round stingrays
      - Urobatis concentricus (Bullseye round stingray)
      - Urobatis halleri (Round stingray)
      - Urobatis jamaicensis (Yellow stingray)
      - Urobatis maculatus (Spotted round ray)
      - Urobatis marmoratus (Chilean round stingray)
      - Urobatis pardalis (Leopard round stingray)
      - Urobatis tumbesensis (Tumbes round stingray)
    - Genus Urotrygon: American round stingrays
      - Urotrygon aspidura (Spiny-tail round ray)
      - Urotrygon caudispinosus (Spine-tailed round ray)
      - Urotrygon chilensis (Chilean round ray)
      - Urotrygon cimar (Denticled stingray)
      - Urotrygon microphthalmum (Smalleyed round stingray)
      - Urotrygon munda (Munda round ray)
      - Urotrygon nana (Dwarf round ray)
      - Urotrygon peruanus (Peruvian stingray)
      - Urotrygon reticulata (Reticulate round ray)
      - Urotrygon rogersi (Roger's round ray)
      - Urotrygon serrula (Saw-spined round ray)
      - Urotrygon simulatrix (Fake round ray)
      - Urotrygon venezuelae (Venezuela round stingray)

=== Superorder Squalomorphi ===
==== Order Hexanchiformes ====
- Family Chlamydoselachidae Garman 1884 (frilled sharks)
  - Genus: Chlamydoselachus Garman, 1884
    - Chlamydoselachus africana Ebert & Compagno, 2009 (Southern African frilled shark)
    - Chlamydoselachus anguineus Garman, 1884 (Frilled shark)
- Family Hexanchidae J. E. Gray 1851 (Cow sharks)
  - Genus: Heptranchias Rafinesque, 1810
    - Heptranchias perlo (Bonnaterre, 1788) (sharpnose sevengill shark)
  - Genus: Hexanchus Rafinesque, 1810
    - Hexanchus griseus (Bonnaterre, 1788) (bluntnose sixgill shark)
    - Hexanchus nakamurai Teng, 1962 (bigeyed sixgill shark)
  - Genus: Notorynchus Ayres, 1855
    - Notorynchus cepedianus (Péron, 1807) (broadnose sevengill shark)

==== Order Squaliformes ====
- Family Centrophoridae Bleeker 1859 (gulper sharks)
  - Genus Centrophorus J. P. Müller & Henle, 1837
    - Centrophorus atromarginatus Garman, 1913 (Dwarf gulper shark)
    - Centrophorus granulosus (Bloch & J. G. Schneider, 1801) (Gulper shark)
    - Centrophorus harrissoni McCulloch, 1915 (Dumb gulper shark)
    - Centrophorus isodon (Y. T. Chu, Q. W. Meng & J. X. Liu, 1981) (Black-fin gulper shark)
    - Centrophorus lusitanicus Barbosa du Bocage & Brito Capello, 1864 (Low-fin gulper shark)
    - Centrophorus moluccensis Bleeker, 1860 (Small-fin gulper shark)
    - Centrophorus seychellorum Baranes, 2003 (Seychelles gulper shark)
    - Centrophorus squamosus (Bonnaterre, 1788) (Leaf-scale gulper shark)
    - Centrophorus tessellatus Garman, 1906 (Mosaic gulper shark)
    - Centrophorus uyato (Rafinesque, 1810) (Little gulper shark)
    - Centrophorus westraliensis W. T. White, Ebert & L. J. V. Compagno, 2008 (Western gulper shark)
    - Centrophorus zeehaani W. T. White, Ebert & L. J. V. Compagno, 2008 (Southern dogfish)
    - Centrophorus sp. A Not yet described (Mini gulper shark)
    - Centrophorus sp. B Not yet described (Slender gulper shark)
  - Genus Deania Jordan & Snyder, 1902
    - Deania calcea (Lowe, 1839) (Bird-beak dogfish)
    - Deania hystricosa (Garman, 1906) (Rough longnose dogfish)
    - Deania profundorum (Smith & Radcliffe, 1912) (Arrow-head dogfish)
    - Deania quadrispinosa (McCulloch, 1915) (Long-snout dogfish)
- Family Echinorhinidae Gill 1862 (bramble/spinous sharks)
  - Genus Echinorhinus Gill, 1862
    - Echinorhinus brucus (Bonnaterre, 1788) (Bramble shark)
    - Echinorhinus cookei Pietschmann, 1928 (Prickly shark)
- Family Etmopteridae Fowler 1934 (lantern sharks)
  - Genus Aculeola F. de Buen, 1959
    - Aculeola nigra F. de Buen, 1959 (Hook-tooth dogfish)
  - Genus Centroscyllium J. P. Müller & Henle, 1841
    - Centroscyllium excelsum Shirai & Nakaya, 1990 (High-fin dogfish)
    - Centroscyllium fabricii (J. C. H. Reinhardt, 1825) (Black dogfish)
    - Centroscyllium granulatum Günther, 1887 (Granular dogfish)
    - Centroscyllium kamoharai T. Abe, 1966 (Bare-skin dogfish)
    - Centroscyllium nigrum Garman, 1899 (Comb-tooth dogfish)
    - Centroscyllium ornatum (Alcock, 1889) (Ornate dogfish)
    - Centroscyllium ritteri D. S. Jordan & Fowler, 1903 (White-fin dogfish)
  - Genus Etmopterus Rafinesque, 1810
    - Etmopterus baxteri Garrick, 1957 (New Zealand lanternshark)
    - Etmopterus benchleyi V. E. Vásquez, Ebert & Long, 2015 (Ninja lanternshark)
    - Etmopterus bigelowi Shirai & Tachikawa, 1993 (Blurred lanternshark)
    - Etmopterus brachyurus H. M. Smith & Radcliffe, 1912 (Short-tail lanternshark)
    - Etmopterus bullisi Bigelow & Schroeder, 1957 (Lined lanternshark)
    - Etmopterus burgessi Schaaf-Da Silva & Ebert, 2006 (Broad-snout lanternshark)
    - Etmopterus carteri S. Springer & G. H. Burgess, 1985 (Cylindrical lanternshark)
    - Etmopterus caudistigmus Last, G. H. Burgess & Séret, 2002 (Tail-spot lanternshark)
    - Etmopterus compagnoi R. Fricke & Koch, 1990 (Brown lanternshark)
    - Etmopterus decacuspidatus W. L. Y. Chan, 1966 (Comb-tooth lanternshark)
    - Etmopterus dianthus Last, G. H. Burgess & Séret, 2002 (Pink lanternshark)
    - Etmopterus dislineatus Last, G. H. Burgess & Séret, 2002 (Lined lanternshark)
    - Etmopterus evansi Last, G. H. Burgess & Séret, 2002 (Black-mouth lanternshark)
    - Etmopterus fusus Last, G. H. Burgess & Séret, 2002 (Pygmy lanternshark)
    - Etmopterus gracilispinis G. Krefft, 1968 (Broad-banded lanternshark)
    - Etmopterus granulosus (Günther, 1880) (Southern lanternshark)
    - Etmopterus hillianus (Poey, 1861) (Caribbean lanternshark)
    - Etmopterus joungi Knuckey, Ebert & G. H. Burgess, 2011 (Short-fin smooth lanternshark)
    - Etmopterus litvinovi Parin & Kotlyar, 1990 (Small-eye lanternshark)
    - Etmopterus lucifer D. S. Jordan & Snyder, 1902 (Black-belly lanternshark)
    - Etmopterus molleri (Whitley, 1939) (Moller's lanternshark)
    - Etmopterus perryi S. Springer & G. H. Burgess, 1985 (Dwarf lanternshark)
    - Etmopterus polli Bigelow, Schroeder & S. Springer, 1953 (African lanternshark)
    - Etmopterus princeps Collett, 1904 (Great lanternshark)
    - Etmopterus pseudosqualiolus Last, G. H. Burgess & Séret, 2002 (False lanternshark)
    - Etmopterus pusillus (R. T. Lowe, 1839) (Smooth lanternshark)
    - Etmopterus pycnolepis Kotlyar, 1990 (Dense-scale lanternshark)
    - Etmopterus robinsi Schofield & G. H. Burgess, 1997 (West Indian lanternshark)
    - Etmopterus schultzi Bigelow, Schroeder & S. Springer, 1953 (Fringe-fin lanternshark)
    - Etmopterus sculptus Ebert, L. J. V. Compagno & De Vries, 2011 (Sculpted lanternshark)
    - Etmopterus sentosus Bass, D'Aubrey & Kistnasamy, 1976 (Thorny lanternshark)
    - Etmopterus sheikoi (Dolganov, 1986) (Rasp-tooth dogfish)
    - Etmopterus spinax (Linnaeus, 1758) (Velvet-belly lanternshark)
    - Etmopterus splendidus Ka. Yano, 1988 (Splendid lanternshark)
    - Etmopterus unicolor (Engelhardt, 1912) (Bristled lanternshark)
    - Etmopterus viator Straube, 2011 (Traveller lanternshark)
    - Etmopterus villosus C. H. Gilbert, 1905 (Hawaiian lanternshark)
    - Etmopterus virens Bigelow, Schroeder & S. Springer, 1953 (Green lanternshark)
    - Etmopterus sp. Not yet described (Guadalupe lanternshark)
    - Etmopterus sp. Not yet described (Chilean lanternshark)
    - Etmopterus sp. Not yet described (Papua short-tail lanternshark)
  - Genus Trigonognathus Mochizuki & F. Ohe, 1990
    - Trigonognathus kabeyai Mochizuki & F. Ohe, 1990 (Viper dogfish)
- Family Oxynotidae Gill 1863 (Rough sharks)
  - Genus Oxynotus Rafinesque, 1810
    - Oxynotus bruniensis (J. D. Ogilby, 1893) (Prickly dogfish)
    - Oxynotus caribbaeus Cervigón, 1961 (Caribbean roughshark)
    - Oxynotus centrina (Linnaeus, 1758) (Angular roughshark)
    - Oxynotus japonicus Ka. Yano & Murofushi, 1985 (Japanese roughshark)
    - Oxynotus paradoxus Frade, 1929 (Sail-fin roughshark)
- Family Somniosidae Jordan 1888 (sleeper sharks)
  - Genus Centroscymnus Barbosa du Bocage & Brito Capello, 1864
    - Centroscymnus coelolepis Barbosa du Bocage & Brito Capello, 1864 (Portuguese dogfish)
    - Centroscymnus owstonii Garman, 1906 (Rough-skin dogfish)
  - Genus Centroselachus Garman, 1913
    - Centroselachus crepidater (Barbosa du Bocage & Brito Capello, 1864) (Long-nose velvet dogfish)
  - Genus Scymnodalatias Garrick, 1956
    - Scymnodalatias albicauda Taniuchi & Garrick, 1986 (White-tail dogfish)
    - Scymnodalatias garricki Kukuev & Konovalenko, 1988 (Azores dogfish)
      - Scymnodalatias oligodon Kukuev & Konovalenko, 1988 (Sparse-tooth dogfish)
    - Scymnodalatias sherwoodi (Archey, 1921) (Sherwood's dogfish)
  - Genus Scymnodon Barbosa du Bocage & Brito Capello, 1864
    - Scymnodon ichiharai Ka. Yano & S. Tanaka (II), 1984 (Japanese velvet dogfish)
    - Scymnodon macracanthus (Regan, 1906) (Large-spine velvet dogfish)
    - Scymnodon plunketi (Waite, 1910) (Plunket's shark)
    - Scymnodon ringens Barbosa du Bocage & Brito Capello, 1864 (Knife-tooth dogfish)
  - Genus Somniosus Lesueur, 1818
    - Somniosus antarcticus Whitley, 1939 (Southern sleeper shark)
    - Somniosus longus (S. Tanaka (I), 1912) (Frog shark)
    - Somniosus microcephalus (Bloch & J. G. Schneider, 1801) (Greenland shark)
    - Somniosus pacificus Bigelow & Schroeder, 1944 (Pacific sleeper shark)
    - Somniosus rostratus (A. Risso, 1827) (Little sleeper shark)
    - Somniosus sp. A Not yet described (Longnose sleeper shark)
  - Genus Zameus D. S. Jordan & Fowler, 1903
    - Zameus squamulosus (Günther, 1877) (Velvet dogfish)
- Family Dalatiidae Gray 1851 (Kitefin sharks)
  - Genus Dalatias Rafinesque, 1810
    - Dalatias licha (Bonnaterre, 1788) (Kitefin shark)
  - Genus Euprotomicroides Hulley & M. J. Penrith, 1966
    - Euprotomicroides zantedeschia Hulley & M. J. Penrith, 1966 (Tail-light shark)
  - Genus Euprotomicrus T. N. Gill, 1865
    - Euprotomicrus bispinatus (Quoy & Gaimard, 1824) (Pygmy shark)
  - Genus Heteroscymnoides Fowler, 1934
    - Heteroscymnoides marleyi Fowler, 1934 (Long-nose pygmy shark)
  - Genus Isistius T. N. Gill, 1865
    - Isistius brasiliensis (Quoy & Gaimard, 1824) (Cookie-cutter shark)
    - Isistius plutodus Garrick & S. Springer, 1964 (Large-tooth cookiecutter shark)
  - Genus Mollisquama Dolganov, 1984
    - Mollisquama parini Dolganov, 1984 (Pocket shark)
  - Genus Squaliolus H. M. Smith & Radcliffe, 1912
    - Squaliolus aliae Teng, 1959 (Small-eye pygmy shark)
    - Squaliolus laticaudus H. M. Smith & Radcliffe, 1912 (Spined pygmy shark)
- Family Squalidae de Blainville 1816 (dogfish sharks)
  - Genus Cirrhigaleus S. Tanaka (I), 1912
    - Cirrhigaleus asper (Merrett, 1973) (Rough-skin spurdog)
    - Cirrhigaleus australis W. T. White, Last & J. D. Stevens, 2007 (Southern mandarin dogfish)
    - Cirrhigaleus barbifer S. Tanaka (I), 1912 (Mandarin dogfish)
  - Genus Squalus Linnaeus, 1758
    - Squalus acanthias Linnaeus, 1758 (Spiny dogfish)
    - Squalus acutipinnis Regan, 1908 (Blunt-nose spiny dogfish)
    - Squalus albifrons Last, W. T. White & J. D. Stevens, 2007 (Eastern highfin spurdog)
    - Squalus altipinnis Last, W. T. White & J. D. Stevens, 2007 (Western highfin spurdog)
    - Squalus blainville (A. Risso, 1827) (Long-nose spurdog)
    - Squalus brevirostris S. Tanaka (I), 1917 (Japanese shortnose spurdog)
    - Squalus bucephalus Last, Séret & Pogonoski, 2007 (Big-head spurdog)
    - Squalus chloroculus Last, W. T. White & Motomura, 2007 (Green-eye spurdog)
    - Squalus crassispinus Last, Edmunds & Yearsley, 2007 (Fat-spine spurdog)
    - Squalus cubensis Howell-Rivero, 1936 (Cuban dogfish)
    - Squalus edmundsi W. T. White, Last & J. D. Stevens, 2007 (Edmund's spurdog)
    - Squalus formosus W. T. White & Iglésias, 2011 (Taiwan spurdog)
    - Squalus grahami W. T. White, Last & J. D. Stevens, 2007 (Eastern longnose spurdog)
    - Squalus griffini Phillipps, 1931 (Northern spiny dogfish)
    - Squalus hemipinnis W. T. White, Last & Yearsley, 2007 (Indonesian shortsnout spurdog)
    - Squalus japonicus Ishikawa, 1908 (Japanese spurdog)
    - Squalus lalannei Baranes, 2003 (Seychelles spurdog)
    - Squalus megalops (W. J. Macleay, 1881) (Short-nose spurdog)
    - Squalus melanurus Fourmanoir & Rivaton, 1979 (Black-tailed spurdog)
    - Squalus mitsukurii D. S. Jordan & Snyder, 1903 (Short-spine spurdog)
    - Squalus montalbani Whitley, 1931 (Indonesian greeneye spurdog)
    - Squalus nasutus Last, L. J. Marshall & W. T. White, 2007 (Western longnose spurdog)
    - Squalus notocaudatus Last, W. T. White & J. D. Stevens, 2007 (Bar-tail spurdog)
    - Squalus rancureli Fourmanoir & Rivaton, 1979 (Cyrano spurdog)
    - Squalus raoulensis C. A. J. Duffy & Last, 2007 (Kermadec spiny dogfish)
    - Squalus suckleyi (Girard, 1854) (Pacific spiny dogfish)
    - Squalus sp. Not yet described (Lombok highfin spurdog)

==== Order Squatiniformes ====
- Family Squatinidae de Blainville 1816 (angel sharks)
  - Genus Squatina A. M. C. Duméril, 1806
    - Squatina aculeata G. Cuvier, 1829 (Saw-back angelshark)
    - Squatina africana Regan, 1908 (African angelshark)
    - Squatina albipunctata Last & W. T. White, 2008 (Eastern angelshark)
    - Squatina argentina (Marini, 1930) (Argentine angelshark)
    - Squatina armata (Philippi {Krumweide}, 1887) (Chilean angelshark)
    - Squatina australis Regan, 1906 (Australian angelshark)
    - Squatina caillieti J. H. Walsh, Ebert & L. J. V. Compagno, 2011 (Philippines angelshark)
    - Squatina californica Ayres, 1859 (Pacific angelshark)
    - Squatina dumeril Lesueur, 1818 (Atlantic angelshark)
    - Squatina formosa S. C. Shen & W. H. Ting, 1972 (Taiwan angelshark)
    - Squatina guggenheim Marini, 1936 (Angular angelshark)
    - Squatina heteroptera Castro-Aguirre, Espinoza-Pérez & Huidobro-Campos, 2007 (Disparate angelshark)
    - Squatina japonica Bleeker, 1858 (Japanese angelshark)
    - Squatina legnota Last & W. T. White, 2008 (Indonesian angelshark)
    - Squatina mexicana Castro-Aguirre, Espinoza-Pérez & Huidobro-Campos, 2007 (Mexican angelshark)
    - Squatina nebulosa Regan, 1906 (Clouded angelshark)
    - Squatina occulta Vooren & K. G. da Silva, 1992 (Hidden angelshark)
    - Squatina oculata Bonaparte, 1840 (Smooth-back angelshark)
    - Squatina pseudocellata Last & W. T. White, 2008 (Western angelshark)
    - Squatina squatina (Linnaeus, 1758) (Angelshark)
    - Squatina tergocellata McCulloch, 1914 (Ornate angelshark)
    - Squatina tergocellatoides J. S. T. F. Chen, 1963 (Ocellated angelshark)

==== Order Pristiophoriformes ====
- Family Pristiophoridae Bleeker 1859 (saw sharks)
  - Genus Pliotrema Regan, 1906
    - Pliotrema warreni Regan, 1906 (Six-gill sawshark)
  - Genus Pristiophorus J. P. Müller & Henle, 1837
    - Pristiophorus cirratus (Latham, 1794) (Long-nose sawshark)
    - Pristiophorus delicatus Yearsley, Last & W. T. White, 2008 (Tropical sawshark)
    - Pristiophorus japonicus Günther, 1870 (Japanese sawshark)
    - Pristiophorus lanae Ebert & Wilms, 2013 (Lana's sawshark)
    - Pristiophorus nancyae Ebert & Cailliet, 2011 (African dwarf sawshark)
    - Pristiophorus nudipinnis Günther, 1870 (Short-nose sawshark)
    - Pristiophorus schroederi S. Springer & Bullis, 1960 (Bahamas sawshark)

=== Superorder Galeomorphi ===
==== Order Heterodontiformes ====
- Family Heterodontidae Gray 1851 (bullhead sharks, horn sharks, Port Jackson sharks)
  - Genus Heterodontus Blainville, 1816
    - Heterodontus francisci (Girard, 1855) (Horn shark)
    - Heterodontus galeatus (Günther, 1870) (Crested bullhead shark)
    - Heterodontus japonicus Maclay & W. J. Macleay, 1884 (Japanese bullhead shark)
    - Heterodontus mexicanus L. R. Taylor & Castro-Aguirre, 1972 (Mexican hornshark)
    - Heterodontus omanensis Z. H. Baldwin, 2005 (Oman bullhead shark)
    - Heterodontus portusjacksoni (F. A. A. Meyer, 1793) (Port Jackson shark)
    - Heterodontus quoyi (Fréminville, 1840) (Galapagos bullhead shark)
    - Heterodontus ramalheira (J. L. B. Smith, 1949) (White-spotted bullhead shark)
    - Heterodontus zebra (J. E. Gray, 1831) (Zebra bullhead shark)
    - Heterodontus sp. X Not yet described (Cryptic hornshark)

==== Order Orectolobiformes ====
- Family Parascylliidae Gill 1962 (collared carpet sharks)
  - Genus Cirrhoscyllium H. M. Smith & Radcliffe, 1913
    - Cirrhoscyllium expolitum H. M. Smith & Radcliffe, 1913 (Barbel-throat carpetshark)
    - Cirrhoscyllium formosanum Teng, 1959 (Taiwan saddled carpetshark)
    - Cirrhoscyllium japonicum Kamohara, 1943 (Saddle carpetshark)
  - Genus Parascyllium T. N. Gill, 1862
    - Parascyllium collare E. P. Ramsay & J. D. Ogilby, 1888 (Collared carpetshark)
    - Parascyllium elongatum Last & J. D. Stevens, 2008 (Elongate carpetshark)
    - Parascyllium ferrugineum McCulloch, 1911 (Rusty carpetshark)
    - Parascyllium sparsimaculatum T. Goto & Last, 2002 (Ginger carpetshark)
    - Parascyllium variolatum (A. H. A. Duméril, 1853) (Necklace carpetshark)
- Family Brachaeluridae Applegate 1974 (blind sharks)
  - Genus Brachaelurus J. D. Ogilby, 1908
    - Brachaelurus colcloughi J. D. Ogilby, 1908 (Blue-grey carpetshark)
    - Brachaelurus waddi (Bloch & J. G. Schneider, 1801) (Blind shark)
- Family Orectolobidae Gill 1896 [Crossorhinidae] (wobbegons)
  - Genus Eucrossorhinus Regan, 1908
    - Eucrossorhinus dasypogon (Bleeker, 1867) (Tasselled wobbegong)
  - Genus Orectolobus Bonaparte, 1834
    - Orectolobus floridus Last & Chidlow, 2008 (Floral banded wobbegong)
    - Orectolobus halei Whitley, 1940 (Banded wobbegong)
    - Orectolobus hutchinsi Last, Chidlow & L. J. V. Compagno, 2006 (Western wobbegong)
    - Orectolobus japonicus Regan, 1906 (Japanese wobbegong)
    - Orectolobus leptolineatus Last, Pogonoski & W. T. White, 2010 (Indonesian wobbegong)
    - Orectolobus maculatus (Bonnaterre, 1788) (Spotted wobbegong)
    - Orectolobus ornatus (De Vis, 1883) (Ornate wobbegong)
    - Orectolobus parvimaculatus Last & Chidlow, 2008 (Dwarf-spotted wobbegong)
    - Orectolobus reticulatus Last, Pogonoski & W. T. White, 2008 (Network wobbegong)
    - Orectolobus wardi Whitley, 1939 (Northern wobbegong)
  - Genus Sutorectus Whitley, 1939
    - Sutorectus tentaculatus (W. K. H. Peters, 1864) (Cobbler wobbegong)
- Family Hemiscylliidae Gill 1862 (bamboo sharks)
  - Genus Chiloscyllium J. P. Müller & Henle, 1837
    - Chiloscyllium arabicum Gubanov, 1980 (Arabian carpetshark)
    - Chiloscyllium burmensis Dingerkus & DeFino, 1983 (Burmese bamboo shark)
    - Chiloscyllium griseum J. P. Müller & Henle, 1838 (Grey bamboo shark)
    - Chiloscyllium hasselti Bleeker, 1852 (Hasselt's bamboo shark)
    - Chiloscyllium indicum (J. F. Gmelin, 1789) (Slender bamboo shark)
    - Chiloscyllium plagiosum (Anonymous, referred to E. T. Bennett, 1830) (White-spotted bamboo shark)
    - Chiloscyllium punctatum J. P. Müller & Henle, 1838 (Brown-banded bamboo shark)
  - Genus Hemiscyllium J. P. Müller & Henle, 1837
    - Hemiscyllium freycineti (Quoy & Gaimard, 1824) (Indonesian speckled carpetshark)
    - Hemiscyllium galei G. R. Allen & Erdmann, 2008 (Cenderawasih epaulette shark)
    - Hemiscyllium hallstromi Whitley, 1967 (Papuan epaulette shark)
    - Hemiscyllium halmahera G. R. Allen, Erdmann & Dudgeon, 2013 (Halmahera epaulette shark)
    - Hemiscyllium henryi G. R. Allen & Erdmann, 2008 (Triton epaulette shark)
    - Hemiscyllium michaeli G. R. Allen & Dudgeon, 2010 (Leopard epaulette shark)
    - Hemiscyllium ocellatum (Bonnaterre, 1788) (Epaulette shark)
    - Hemiscyllium strahani Whitley, 1967 (Hooded carpetshark)
    - Hemiscyllium trispeculare J. Richardson, 1843 (Speckled carpetshark)
    - Hemiscyllium sp. Not yet described (Seychelles carpetshark)
- Family Ginglymostomatidae Gill 1862 (nurse sharks)
  - Genus Ginglymostoma J. P. Müller & Henle, 1837
    - Ginglymostoma cirratum (Bonnaterre, 1788) (Nurse shark)
    - Ginglymostoma unami Del-Moral-Flores, Ramírez-Antonio, Angulo & Pérez-Ponce de León, 2015 (Pacific nurse shark)
  - Genus Nebrius Rüppell, 1837
    - Nebrius ferrugineus (Lesson, 1831) (Tawny nurse shark)
  - Genus Pseudoginglymostoma Dingerkus, 1986
    - Pseudoginglymostoma brevicaudatum (Günther, 1867) (Short-tail nurse shark)
- Family Rhincodontidae Müller & Henle 1841 (whale sharks)
  - Genus Rhincodon A. Smith, 1828
    - Rhincodon typus A. Smith, 1828 (Whale shark)
- Family Stegostomatidae Gill 1862 (zebra sharks)
  - Genus Stegostoma J. P. Müller & Henle, 1837
    - Stegostoma fasciatum (Hermann, 1783) (Zebra shark)

==== Order Lamniformes ====
- Family Mitsukurinidae Jordan 1898 (goblin sharks)
  - Genus Mitsukurina D. S. Jordan, 1898
    - Mitsukurina owstoni D. S. Jordan, 1898 (Goblin shark)
- Family Odontaspididae Müller & Henle 1839 (sand tigers)
  - Genus Carcharias Rafinesque, 1810
    - Carcharias taurus Rafinesque, 1810 (Sand-tiger shark)
  - Genus Odontaspis Agassiz, 1838
    - Odontaspis ferox (A. Risso, 1810) (Small-tooth sandtiger shark)
    - Odontaspis noronhai (Maul, 1955) (Big-eye sandtiger shark)
- Family Alopiidae (Thresher sharks)
  - Genus Alopias Rafinesque, 1810
    - Alopias pelagicus Nakamura, 1935 (Pelagic thresher shark)
    - Alopias superciliosus R. T. Lowe, 1841 (Big-eye thresher shark)
    - Alopias vulpinus (Bonnaterre, 1788) (Thresher shark)
- Family Pseudocarchariidae Taylor, Compagno & Struhsaker (crocodile shark)
  - Genus Pseudocarcharias Cadenat, 1963
    - Pseudocarcharias kamoharai (Matsubara, 1936) (Crocodile shark)
- Family Megachasmidae Taylor, Compagno & Struhsaker 1983 megamouth sharks)
  - Genus Megachasma L. R. Taylor, L. J. V. Compagno & Struhsaker, 1983
    - Megachasma pelagios L. R. Taylor, L. J. V. Compagno & Struhsaker, 1983 (Megamouth shark)
- Family Cetorhinidae Gill 1862 (basking sharks)
  - Genus Cetorhinus Blainville, 1816
    - Cetorhinus maximus (Gunnerus, 1765) (Basking shark)
- Family Lamnidae Müller & Henle 1838 (blue sharks)
  - Genus Carcharodon A. Smith, 1838
    - Carcharodon carcharias (Linnaeus, 1758) (Great white shark)
  - Genus Isurus Rafinesque, 1810
    - Isurus oxyrinchus Rafinesque, 1810 (Short-fin mako)
    - Isurus paucus Guitart-Manday, 1966 (Long-fin mako)
  - Genus Lamna G. Cuvier, 1816
    - Lamna ditropis C. L. Hubbs & Follett, 1947 (Salmon shark)
    - Lamna nasus (Bonnaterre, 1788) (Porbeagle shark)

==== Order Carcharhiniformes ====
- Family Scyliorhinidae Gill 1862 (catsharks)
  - Genus Apristurus Garman, 1913
    - Apristurus albisoma Nakaya & Séret, 1999 (White-bodied catshark)
    - Apristurus ampliceps Sasahara, K. Sato & Nakaya, 2008 (Rough-skin catshark)
    - Apristurus aphyodes Nakaya & Stehmann, 1998 (White ghost catshark)
    - Apristurus australis K. Sato, Nakaya & Yorozu, 2008 (Pinocchio catshark)
    - Apristurus breviventralis Kawauchi, Weigmann & Nakaya, 2014 (Short-belly catshark)
    - Apristurus brunneus (C. H. Gilbert, 1892) (Brown catshark)
    - Apristurus bucephalus W. T. White, Last & Pogonoski, 2008 (Big-head catshark)
    - Apristurus canutus S. Springer & Heemstra, 1979 (Hoary catshark)
    - Apristurus exsanguis K. Sato, Nakaya & A. L. Stewart, 1999 (Flaccid catshark)
    - Apristurus fedorovi Dolganov, 1985 (Fedorov's catshark)
    - Apristurus garricki K. Sato, A. L. Stewart & Nakaya, 2013 (Garrick's catshark)
    - Apristurus gibbosus Q. W. Meng, Y. T. Chu & S. Li, 1985 (Humpback catshark)
    - Apristurus herklotsi (Fowler, 1934) (Long-fin catshark)
    - Apristurus indicus (A. B. Brauer, 1906) (Small-belly catshark)
    - Apristurus internatus S. M. Deng, G. Q. Xiong & H. X. Zhan, 1988 (Short-nose demon catshark)
    - Apristurus investigatoris (Misra, 1962) (Broad-nose catshark)
    - Apristurus japonicus Nakaya, 1975 (Japanese catshark)
    - Apristurus kampae L. R. Taylor, 1972 (Long-nose catshark)
    - Apristurus laurussonii (Sæmundsson, 1922) (Iceland catshark)
    - Apristurus longicephalus Nakaya, 1975 (Long-head catshark)
    - Apristurus macrorhynchus (S. Tanaka (I), 1909) (Flat-head catshark)
    - Apristurus macrostomus Q. W. Meng, Y. T. Chu & S. Li, 1985 (Broad-mouth catshark)
    - Apristurus manis (S. Springer, 1979) (Ghost catshark)
    - Apristurus melanoasper Iglésias, Nakaya & Stehmann, 2004 (Black roughscale catshark)
    - Apristurus microps (Gilchrist, 1922) (Small-eye catshark)
    - Apristurus micropterygeus Q. W. Meng, Y. T. Chu & S. Li, 1986 (Small-dorsal catshark)
    - Apristurus nakayai Iglésias, 2013 (Milk-eye catshark)
    - Apristurus nasutus F. de Buen, 1959 (Large-nose catshark)
    - Apristurus parvipinnis S. Springer & Heemstra, 1979 (Small-fin catshark)
    - Apristurus pinguis S. M. Deng, G. Q. Xiong & H. X. Zhan, 1983 (Fat catshark)
    - Apristurus platyrhynchus (S. Tanaka (I), 1909) (Borneo catshark)
    - Apristurus profundorum (Goode & T. H. Bean, 1896) (Deep-water catshark)
    - Apristurus riveri Bigelow & Schroeder, 1944 (Broad-gill catshark)
    - Apristurus saldanha (Barnard, 1925) (Saldanha catshark)
    - Apristurus sibogae (M. C. W. Weber, 1913) (Pale catshark)
    - Apristurus sinensis Y. T. Chu & A. S. Hu, 1981 (South China catshark)
    - Apristurus spongiceps (C. H. Gilbert, 1905) (Sponge-head catshark)
    - Apristurus stenseni (S. Springer, 1979) (Panama ghost catshark)
    - Apristurus sp. X Not yet described (Galbraith's catshark)
    - Apristurus sp. 3 Not yet described (Black wonder catshark)
  - Genus Asymbolus Whitley, 1939
    - Asymbolus analis (J. D. Ogilby, 1885) (Australian spotted catshark)
    - Asymbolus funebris L. J. V. Compagno, J. D. Stevens & Last, 1999 (Blotched catshark)
    - Asymbolus galacticus Séret & Last, 2008 (Starry catshark)
    - Asymbolus occiduus Last, M. F. Gomon & Gledhill, 1999 (Western spotted catshark)
    - Asymbolus pallidus Last, M. F. Gomon & Gledhill, 1999 (Pale spotted catshark)
    - Asymbolus parvus L. J. V. Compagno, Stevens & Last, 1999 (Dwarf catshark)
    - Asymbolus rubiginosus Last, M. F. Gomon & Gledhill, 1999 (Orange spotted catshark)
    - Asymbolus submaculatus L. J. V. Compagno, J. D. Stevens & Last, 1999 (Variegated catshark)
    - Asymbolus vincenti (Zietz (fi), 1908) (Gulf catshark)
  - Genus Atelomycterus Garman, 1913
    - Atelomycterus baliensis W. T. White, Last & Dharmadi, 2005 (Bali catshark)
    - Atelomycterus erdmanni Fahmi & W. T. White, 2015 (Spotted-belly catshark)
    - Atelomycterus fasciatus L. J. V. Compagno & J. D. Stevens, 1993 (Banded sand catshark)
    - Atelomycterus macleayi Whitley, 1939 (Australian marbled catshark)
    - Atelomycterus marmoratus (Anonymous, referred to E. T. Bennett, 1830) (Coral catshark)
    - Atelomycterus marnkalha Jacobsen & M. B. Bennett, 2007 (Eastern banded catshark)
  - Genus Aulohalaelurus Fowler, 1934
    - Aulohalaelurus kanakorum Séret, 1990 (Kanakorum catshark)
    - Aulohalaelurus labiosus (Waite, 1905) (Australian black-spotted catshark)
  - Genus Bythaelurus L. J. V. Compagno, 1988
    - Bythaelurus alcockii (Garman, 1913) (Arabian catshark)
    - Bythaelurus canescens (Günther, 1878) (Dusky catshark)
    - Bythaelurus clevai (Séret, 1987) (Broad-head catshark)
    - Bythaelurus dawsoni (S. Springer, 1971) (New Zealand catshark)
    - Bythaelurus giddingsi J. E. McCosker, Long & C. C. Baldwin, 2012 (Galápagos catshark)
    - Bythaelurus hispidus (Alcock, 1891) (Bristly catshark)
    - Bythaelurus immaculatus (Y. T. Chu & Q. W. Meng, 1982) (Spot-less catshark)
    - Bythaelurus incanus Last & J. D. Stevens, 2008 (Sombre catshark)
    - Bythaelurus lutarius (S. Springer & D'Aubrey, 1972) (Mud catshark)
    - Bythaelurus naylori Ebert & Clerkin, 2015 (Dusky-snout catshark)
    - Bythaelurus tenuicephalus Kaschner, Weigmann & Thiel, 2015 (Narrow-head catshark)
  - Genus Cephaloscyllium T. N. Gill, 1862
    - Cephaloscyllium albipinnum Last, Motomura & W. T. White, 2008 (White-fin swellshark)
    - Cephaloscyllium cooki Last, Séret & W. T. White, 2008 (Cook's swellshark)
    - Cephaloscyllium fasciatum W. L. Y. Chan, 1966 (Reticulated swellshark)
    - Cephaloscyllium formosanum Teng, 1962 (Formosa swellshark)
    - Cephaloscyllium hiscosellum W. T. White & Ebert, 2008 (Australian reticulate swellshark)
    - Cephaloscyllium isabellum (Bonnaterre, 1788) (Draughtsboard shark)
    - Cephaloscyllium laticeps (A. H. A. Duméril, 1853) (Australian swellshark)
    - Cephaloscyllium pictum Last, Séret & W. T. White, 2008 (Painted swellshark)
    - Cephaloscyllium sarawakensis Ka. Yano, A. Ahmad & Gambang, 2005 (Sarawak pygmy swellshark)
    - Cephaloscyllium signourum Last, Séret & W. T. White, 2008 (Flag-tail swellshark)
    - Cephaloscyllium silasi (Talwar, 1974) (Indian swellshark)
    - Cephaloscyllium speccum Last, Séret & W. T. White, 2008 (Speckled swellshark)
    - Cephaloscyllium stevensi E. Clark & J. E. Randall, 2011 (Steven's swellshark)
    - Cephaloscyllium sufflans (Regan, 1921) (Balloon shark)
    - Cephaloscyllium umbratile D. S. Jordan & Fowler, 1903 (Blotchy swellshark)
    - Cephaloscyllium variegatum Last & W. T. White, 2008 (Saddled swellshark)
    - Cephaloscyllium ventriosum (Garman, 1880) (Swellshark)
    - Cephaloscyllium zebrum Last & W. T. White, 2008 (Narrow-bar swellshark)
    - Cephaloscyllium sp. 1 Not yet described (Philippines swellshark)
  - Genus Cephalurus Bigelow & Schroeder, 1941
    - Cephalurus cephalus (C. H. Gilbert, 1892) (Lollipop catshark)
    - Cephalurus sp. A Not yet described (Southern lollipop catshark)
  - Genus Figaro Whitley, 1928
    - Figaro boardmani (Whitley, 1928) (Australian sawtail catshark)
    - Figaro striatus Gledhill, Last & W. T. White, 2008 (Northern sawtail catshark)
  - Genus Galeus G. Cuvier, 1816
    - Galeus antillensis S. Springer, 1979 (Antilles catshark)
    - Galeus arae (Nichols, 1927) (Rough-tail catshark)
    - Galeus atlanticus (Vaillant, 1888) (Atlantic sawtail catshark)
    - Galeus cadenati S. Springer, 1966 (Long-fin sawtail catshark)
    - Galeus eastmani (D. S. Jordan & Snyder, 1904) (Gecko catshark)
    - Galeus gracilis L. J. V. Compagno & J. D. Stevens, 1993 (Slender sawtail catshark)
    - Galeus longirostris Tachikawa & Taniuchi, 1987 (Long-nose sawtail catshark)
    - Galeus melastomus Rafinesque, 1810 (Black-mouth catshark)
    - Galeus mincaronei Soto, 2001 (Southern sawtail catshark)
    - Galeus murinus (Collett, 1904) (Mouse catshark)
    - Galeus nipponensis Nakaya, 1975 (Broad-fin sawtail catshark)
    - Galeus piperatus S. Springer & M. H. Wagner, 1966 (Peppered catshark)
    - Galeus polli Cadenat, 1959 (African sawtail catshark)
    - Galeus priapus Séret & Last, 2008 (Phallic catshark)
    - Galeus sauteri (D. S. Jordan & R. E. Richardson, 1909) (Black-tip sawtail catshark)
    - Galeus schultzi S. Springer, 1979 (Dwarf sawtail catshark)
    - Galeus springeri Konstantinou & Cozzi, 1998 (Springer's sawtail catshark)
  - Genus Halaelurus T. N. Gill, 1862
    - Halaelurus boesemani S. Springer & D'Aubrey, 1972 (Speckled catshark)
    - Halaelurus buergeri (J. P. Müller & Henle, 1838) (Black-spotted catshark)
    - Halaelurus lineatus Bass, D'Aubrey & Kistnasamy, 1975 (Lined catshark)
    - Halaelurus maculosus W. T. White, Last & J. D. Stevens, 2007 (Indonesian speckled catshark)
    - Halaelurus natalensis (Regan, 1904) (Tiger catshark)
    - Halaelurus quagga (Alcock, 1899) (Quagga catshark)
    - Halaelurus sellus W. T. White, Last & J. D. Stevens, 2007 (Rusty catshark)
  - Genus Haploblepharus Garman, 1913
    - Haploblepharus edwardsii (Schinz, 1822) (Puffadder shyshark)
    - Haploblepharus fuscus J. L. B. Smith, 1950 (Brown shyshark)
    - Haploblepharus kistnasamyi Human & L. J. V. Compagno, 2006 (Natal shyshark)
    - Haploblepharus pictus (J. P. Müller & Henle, 1838) (Dark shyshark)
  - Genus Holohalaelurus Fowler, 1934
    - Holohalaelurus favus Human, 2006 (Honey-comb catshark)
    - Holohalaelurus grennian Human, 2006 (Grinning catshark)
    - Holohalaelurus melanostigma (Norman, 1939) (Crying catshark)
    - Holohalaelurus punctatus (Gilchrist, 1914) (White-spotted catshark)
    - Holohalaelurus regani (Gilchrist, 1922) (Izak catshark)
  - Genus Parmaturus Garman, 1906
    - Parmaturus albimarginatus Séret & Last, 2007 (White-tip catshark)
    - Parmaturus albipenis Séret & Last, 2007 (White-clasper catshark)
    - Parmaturus bigus Séret & Last, 2007 (Beige catshark)
    - Parmaturus campechiensis S. Springer, 1979 (Campeche catshark)
    - Parmaturus lanatus Séret & Last, 2007 (Velvet catshark)
    - Parmaturus macmillani Hardy, 1985 (McMillan's catshark)
    - Parmaturus melanobranchius (W. L. Y. Chan, 1966) (Black-gill catshark)
    - Parmaturus pilosus Garman, 1906 (Salamander catshark)
    - Parmaturus xaniurus (C. H. Gilbert, 1892) (File-tail catshark)
    - Parmaturus sp. Not yet described (Rough-back catshark)
    - Parmaturus sp. Not yet described (Indonesian filetail catshark)
    - Parmaturus sp. Not yet described (Gulf of Mexico filetail catshark)
  - Genus Poroderma A. Smith, 1838
    - Poroderma africanum (J. F. Gmelin, 1789) (Striped catshark)
    - Poroderma pantherinum (J. P. Müller & Henle, 1838) (Leopard catshark)
  - Genus Schroederichthys A. Smith, 1838
    - Schroederichthys bivius (J. P. Müller & Henle, 1838) (Narrow-mouthed catshark)
    - Schroederichthys chilensis (Guichenot, 1848) (Red-spotted catshark)
    - Schroederichthys maculatus S. Springer, 1966 (Narrow-tail catshark)
    - Schroederichthys saurisqualus Soto, 2001 (Lizard catshark)
    - Schroederichthys tenuis S. Springer, 1966 (Slender catshark)
  - Genus Scyliorhinus Blainville, 1816
    - Scyliorhinus boa Goode & T. H. Bean, 1896 (Boa catshark)
    - Scyliorhinus cabofriensis K. D. A. Soares, U. L. Gomes & M. R. de Carvalho, 2016
    - Scyliorhinus canicula (Linnaeus, 1758) (Lesser-spotted catshark)
    - Scyliorhinus capensis (J. P. Müller & Henle, 1838) (Yellow-spotted catshark)
    - Scyliorhinus cervigoni Maurin & M. Bonnet, 1970 (West African catshark)
    - Scyliorhinus comoroensis L. J. V. Compagno, 1988 (Comoro catshark)
    - Scyliorhinus garmani (Fowler, 1934) (Brown-spotted catshark)
    - Scyliorhinus haeckelii (A. Miranda-Ribeiro, 1907) (Freckled catshark)
    - Scyliorhinus hesperius S. Springer, 1966 (White-saddled catshark)
    - Scyliorhinus meadi S. Springer, 1966 (Blotched catshark)
    - Scyliorhinus retifer (Garman, 1881) (Chain catshark)
    - Scyliorhinus stellaris (Linnaeus, 1758) (Nursehound)
    - Scyliorhinus tokubee Shirai, S. Hagiwara & Nakaya, 1992 (Izu catshark)
    - Scyliorhinus torazame (S. Tanaka (I), 1908) (Cloudy catshark)
    - Scyliorhinus torrei Howell-Rivero, 1936 (Dwarf catshark)
    - Scyliorhinus ugoi K. D. A. Soares, Gadig & U. L. Gomes, 2015 (Dark freckled catshark)
    - Scyliorhinus sp. X Not yet described (Oakley's catshark)
- Family Proscylliidae Fowler 1941 (finback catsharks)
  - Genus Ctenacis L. J. V. Compagno, 1973
    - Ctenacis fehlmanni (S. Springer, 1968) (Harlequin catshark)
  - Genus Eridacnis H. M. Smith, 1913
    - Eridacnis barbouri (Bigelow & Schroeder, 1944) (Cuban ribbontail catshark)
    - Eridacnis radcliffei H. M. Smith, 1913 (Pygmy ribbontail catshark)
    - Eridacnis sinuans (J. L. B. Smith, 1957) (African ribbontail catshark)
    - Eridacnis sp. 1 Not yet described (Philippines ribbontail catshark)
  - Genus Proscyllium Hilgendorf, 1904
    - Proscyllium habereri Hilgendorf, 1904 (Graceful catshark)
    - Proscyllium magnificum Last & Vongpanich, 2004 (Magnificent catshark)
- Family Pentanchidae Smith 1912 (deepwater catsharks)
  - Genus Pentanchus H. M. Smith & Radcliffe, 1912
    - Pentanchus profundicolus H. M. Smith & Radcliffe, 1912 (One-fin catshark)
- Family Pseudotriakidae Gill 1893 (false cat sharks)
  - Genus Gollum L. J. V. Compagno, 1973
    - Gollum attenuatus (Garrick, 1954) (Slender smooth-hound)
    - Gollum suluensis Last & Gaudiano, 2011 (Sulu gollumshark)
    - Gollum sp. B Not yet described (White-marked gollumshark)
  - Genus Planonasus Weigmann, Stehmann & Thiel, 2013
    - Planonasus parini Weigmann, Stehmann & Thiel, 2013 (Dwarf false catshark)
  - Genus Pseudotriakis Brito Capello, 1868
    - Pseudotriakis microdon Brito Capello, 1868 (False catshark)
- Family Triakidae Gray 1851 (hound sharks)
  - Genus Furgaleus Whitley, 1951
    - Furgaleus macki (Whitley, 1943) (Whiskery shark)
  - Genus Galeorhinus Blainville, 1816
    - Galeorhinus galeus (Linnaeus, 1758) (Tope shark)
  - Genus Gogolia L. J. V. Compagno, 1973
    - Gogolia filewoodi L. J. V. Compagno, 1973 (Sail-back houndshark)
  - Genus Hemitriakis Herre, 1923
    - Hemitriakis abdita L. J. V. Compagno & J. D. Stevens, 1993 (Deep-water sicklefin houndshark)
    - Hemitriakis complicofasciata T. Takahashi & Nakaya, 2004 (Ocellate topeshark)
    - Hemitriakis falcata L. J. V. Compagno & J. D. Stevens, 1993 (Sickle-fin houndshark)
    - Hemitriakis indroyonoi W. T. White, L. J. V. Compagno & Dharmadi, 2009 (Indonesian houndshark)
    - Hemitriakis japanica (J. P. Müller & Henle, 1839) (Japanese topeshark)
    - Hemitriakis leucoperiptera Herre, 1923 (White-fin topeshark)
  - Genus Hypogaleus J. L. B. Smith, 1957
    - Hypogaleus hyugaensis (Miyosi, 1939) (Black-tip tope)
  - Genus Iago L. J. V. Compagno & S. Springer, 1971
    - Iago garricki Fourmanoir & Rivaton, 1979 (Long-nose houndshark)
    - Iago omanensis (Norman, 1939) (Big-eye houndshark)
  - Genus Mustelus H. F. Linck, 1790
    - Mustelus albipinnis Castro-Aguirre, Antuna-Mendiola, González-Acosta & De La Cruz-Agüero, 2005 (White-margin fin houndshark)
    - Mustelus antarcticus Günther, 1870 (Gummy shark)
    - Mustelus asterias Cloquet, 1821 (Starry smooth-hound)
    - Mustelus californicus T. N. Gill, 1864 (Grey smooth-hound)
    - Mustelus canis (Mitchill, 1815)
      - M. c. canis (Mitchill, 1815) (Dusky smooth-hound)
      - M. c. insularis Heemstra, 1997 (Caribbean smooth-hound)
    - Mustelus dorsalis T. N. Gill, 1864 (Sharp-tooth smooth-hound)
    - Mustelus fasciatus (Garman, 1913) (Striped smooth-hound)
    - Mustelus griseus Pietschmann, 1908 (Spot-less smooth-hound)
    - Mustelus henlei (T. N. Gill, 1863) (Brown smooth-hound)
    - Mustelus higmani S. Springer & R. H. Lowe, 1963 (Small-eye smooth-hound)
    - Mustelus lenticulatus Phillipps, 1932 (Spotted estuary smooth-hound)
    - Mustelus lunulatus D. S. Jordan & C. H. Gilbert, 1882 (Sickle-fin smooth-hound)
    - Mustelus manazo Bleeker, 1854 (Star-spotted smooth-hound)
    - Mustelus mangalorensis Cubelio, Remya R & Kurup, 2011 (Mangalore houndshark)
    - Mustelus mento Cope, 1877 (Speckled smooth-hound)
    - Mustelus minicanis Heemstra, 1997 (Dwarf smooth-hound)
    - Mustelus mosis Hemprich & Ehrenberg, 1899 (Arabian smooth-hound)
    - Mustelus mustelus (Linnaeus, 1758) (Common smooth-hound)
    - Mustelus norrisi S. Springer, 1939 (Narrow-fin smooth-hound)
    - Mustelus palumbes J. L. B. Smith, 1957 (White-spotted smooth-hound)
    - Mustelus punctulatus A. Risso, 1827 (Black-spotted smooth-hound)
    - Mustelus ravidus W. T. White & Last, 2006 (Australian grey smooth-hound)
    - Mustelus schmitti S. Springer, 1939 (Narrow-nose smooth-hound)
    - Mustelus sinusmexicanus Heemstra, 1997 (Gulf smooth-hound)
    - Mustelus stevensi W. T. White & Last, 2008 (Western spotted gummy shark)
    - Mustelus walkeri W. T. White & Last, 2008 (Eastern spotted gummy shark)
    - Mustelus whitneyi Chirichigno F., 1973 (Humpback smooth-hound)
    - Mustelus widodoi W. T. White & Last, 2006 (White-fin smooth-hound)
    - Mustelus sp. Not yet described (Sarawak smooth-hound)
    - Mustelus sp. Not yet described (Kermadec smooth-hound)
  - Genus Scylliogaleus Boulenger, 1902
    - Scylliogaleus quecketti Boulenger, 1902 (Flap-nose houndshark)
  - Genus Triakis J. P. Müller & Henle, 1838
    - Triakis acutipinna Kato, 1968 (Sharp-fin houndshark)
    - Triakis maculata Kner & Steindachner, 1867 (Spotted houndshark)
    - Triakis megalopterus (A. Smith, 1839) (Sharp-tooth houndshark)
    - Triakis scyllium J. P. Müller & Henle, 1839 (Banded houndshark)
    - Triakis semifasciata Girard, 1855 (Leopard shark)
- Family Leptochariidae Gray 1851 (barbeled houndsharks)
  - Genus Leptocharias A. Smith, 1838
    - Leptocharias smithii (J. P. Müller & Henle, 1839) (Barbeled houndshark)
- Family Hemigaleidae Hasse 1878 (weasel sharks)
  - Genus Chaenogaleus T. N. Gill, 1862
    - Chaenogaleus macrostoma (Bleeker, 1852) (Hook-tooth shark)
  - Genus Hemigaleus Bleeker, 1852
    - Hemigaleus australiensis W. T. White, Last & L. J. V. Compagno, 2005 (Australian weasel shark)
    - Hemigaleus microstoma Bleeker, 1852 (Sickle-fin weasel shark)
  - Genus Hemipristis Agassiz, 1843
    - Hemipristis elongata (Klunzinger, 1871) (Snaggle-tooth shark)
  - Genus Paragaleus Budker, 1935
    - Paragaleus leucolomatus L. J. V. Compagno & Smale, 1985 (White-tip weasel shark)
    - Paragaleus pectoralis (Garman, 1906) (Atlantic weasel shark)
    - Paragaleus randalli L. J. V. Compagno, Krupp & K. E. Carpenter, 1996 (Slender weasel shark)
    - Paragaleus tengi (J. S. T. F. Chen, 1963) (Straight-tooth weasel shark)
- Family Carcharhinidae Jordan & Evermann 1896 (requiem sharks)
  - Genus Carcharhinus Blainville, 1816
    - Carcharhinus acronotus (Poey, 1860) (Black-nose shark)
    - Carcharhinus albimarginatus (Rüppell, 1837) (Silver-tip shark)
    - Carcharhinus altimus (S. Springer, 1950) (Big-nose shark)
    - Carcharhinus amblyrhynchoides (Whitley, 1934) (Graceful shark)
    - Carcharhinus amblyrhynchos (Bleeker, 1856) (Black-tail reef shark)
    - Carcharhinus amboinensis (J. P. Müller & Henle, 1839) (Pig-eye shark)
    - Carcharhinus borneensis (Bleeker, 1858) (Borneo shark)
    - Carcharhinus brachyurus (Günther, 1870) (Copper shark)
    - Carcharhinus brevipinna (J. P. Müller & Henle, 1839) (Spinner shark)
    - Carcharhinus cautus (Whitley, 1945) (Nervous shark)
    - Carcharhinus cerdale C. H. Gilbert, 1898 (Pacific smalltail shark)
    - Carcharhinus coatesi (Whitley, 1939) (Coates' shark)
    - Carcharhinus dussumieri (J. P. Müller & Henle, 1839) (White-cheek shark)
    - Carcharhinus falciformis (J. P. Müller & Henle, 1839) (Silky shark)
    - Carcharhinus fitzroyensis (Whitley, 1943) (Creek whaler)
    - Carcharhinus galapagensis (Snodgrass & Heller, 1905) (Galapagos shark)
    - Carcharhinus hemiodon (J. P. Müller & Henle, 1839) (Pondicherry shark)
    - Carcharhinus humani W. T. White & Weigmann, 2014 (Human's whaler shark)
    - Carcharhinus isodon (J. P. Müller & Henle, 1839) (Fine-tooth shark)
    - Carcharhinus leiodon Garrick, 1985 (Smooth-tooth blacktip shark)
    - Carcharhinus leucas (J. P. Müller & Henle, 1839) (Bull shark)
    - Carcharhinus limbatus (J. P. Müller & Henle, 1839) (Black-tip shark)
    - Carcharhinus longimanus (Poey, 1861) (Oceanic whitetip shark)
    - Carcharhinus macloti (J. P. Müller & Henle, 1839) (Hard-nose shark)
    - Carcharhinus melanopterus (Quoy & Gaimard, 1824) (Black-tip reef shark)
    - Carcharhinus obscurus (Lesueur, 1818) (Dusky shark)
    - Carcharhinus perezi (Poey, 1876) (Caribbean reef shark)
    - Carcharhinus plumbeus (Nardo, 1827) (Sandbar shark)
    - Carcharhinus porosus (Ranzani, 1839) (Small-tail shark)
    - Carcharhinus sealei (Pietschmann, 1913) (Black-spot shark)
    - Carcharhinus signatus (Poey, 1868) (Night shark)
    - Carcharhinus sorrah (J. P. Müller & Henle, 1839) (Spot-tail shark)
    - Carcharhinus tilstoni (Whitley, 1950) (Australian blacktip shark)
    - Carcharhinus tjutjot (Bleeker, 1852) (Indonesian whaler shark)
    - Carcharhinus sp. A Not yet described (False smalltail shark)
  - Genus Galeocerdo J. P. Müller & Henle, 1837
    - Galeocerdo cuvier (Péron & Lesueur, 1822) (Tiger shark)
  - Genus Glyphis Agassiz, 1843
    - Glyphis gangeticus (J. P. Müller & Henle, 1839) (Ganges shark)
    - Glyphis garricki L. J. V. Compagno, W. T. White & Last, 2008 (Northern river shark)
    - Glyphis glyphis (J. P. Müller & Henle, 1839) (Spear-tooth shark)
    - Glyphis sp. Not yet described (Mukah river shark)
  - Genus Isogomphodon T. N. Gill, 1862
    - Isogomphodon oxyrhynchus (J. P. Müller & Henle, 1839) (Dagger-nose shark)
  - Genus Lamiopsis T. N. Gill, 1862
    - Lamiopsis temmincki (J. P. Müller & Henle, 1839) (Broad-fin shark)
    - Lamiopsis tephrodes (Fowler, 1905) (Borneo broadfin shark)
  - Genus Loxodon J. P. Müller & Henle, 1839
    - Loxodon macrorhinus J. P. Müller & Henle, 1839 (Slit-eye shark)
  - Genus Nasolamia L. J. V. Compagno & Garrick, 1983
    - Nasolamia velox (C. H. Gilbert, 1898) (White-nose shark)
  - Genus Negaprion Whitley, 1940
    - Negaprion acutidens (Rüppell, 1837) (Sickle-fin lemon shark)
    - Negaprion brevirostris (Poey, 1868) (Lemon shark)
  - Genus Prionace Cantor, 1849
    - Prionace glauca (Linnaeus, 1758) (Blue shark)
  - Genus Rhizoprionodon Whitley, 1929
    - Rhizoprionodon acutus (Rüppell, 1837) (Milk shark)
    - Rhizoprionodon lalandii (J. P. Müller & Henle, 1839) (Brazilian sharpnose shark)
    - Rhizoprionodon longurio (D. S. Jordan & C. H. Gilbert, 1882) (Pacific sharpnose shark)
    - Rhizoprionodon oligolinx V. G. Springer, 1964 (Grey sharpnose shark)
    - Rhizoprionodon porosus (Poey, 1861) (Caribbean sharpnose shark)
    - Rhizoprionodon taylori (J. D. Ogilby, 1915) (Australian sharpnose shark)
    - Rhizoprionodon terraenovae (J. Richardson, 1836) (Atlantic sharpnose shark)
  - Genus Scoliodon J. P. Müller & Henle, 1838
    - Scoliodon laticaudus J. P. Müller & Henle, 1838 (Spade-nose shark)
    - Scoliodon macrorhynchos (Bleeker, 1852) (Pacific spadenose shark)
  - Genus Triaenodon J. P. Müller & Henle, 1837
    - Triaenodon obesus (Rüppell, 1837) (White-tip reef shark)

== See also ==
- Chondrichthyes
- List of prehistoric cartilaginous fish
- List of sharks
- List of fishes
- Largest organisms
- Threatened rays
- Threatened sharks
- Cartilage
- Fish
- Animals
