= Salalah (disambiguation) =

Salalah (Arabic: صَلَالَة, romanized: Ṣalālah) may refer to:

- Salalah, the capital and largest city of the southern Omani governorate of Dhofar
- Salalah Sport Club (Salalah SC), also known as Salalah, an Omani football club based in Salalah
- Salalah guitarfish (Acroteriobatus salalah), a species of fish in the family Rhinobatidae, found only in Salalah

== See also ==
- Salaleh (Persian: سلاله), a village in Azadlu Rural District of Muran District in Germi County, Ardabil province, Iran.
