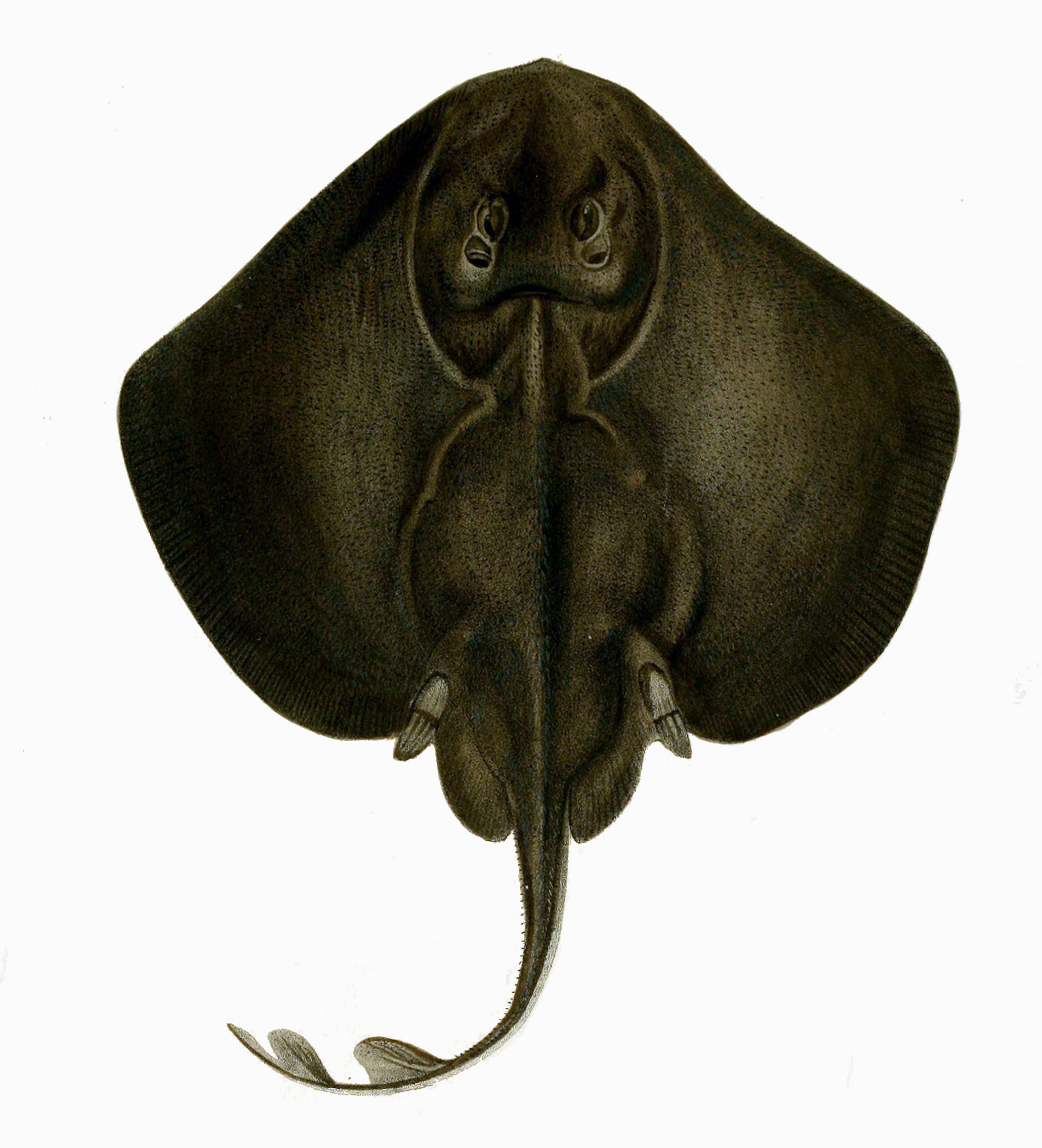
- Rough ray ventral side

Conservation status
- Endangered (IUCN 3.1)

Scientific classification
- Kingdom: Animalia
- Phylum: Chordata
- Class: Chondrichthyes
- Subclass: Elasmobranchii
- Order: Rajiformes
- Family: Rajidae
- Genus: Raja
- Species: R. radula

Binomial name
- Raja radula Delaroche, 1809

= Raja radula =

Rough ray

Ray in the genus Raja

The rough ray (Raja radula) is a Mediterranean ray species of the Rajidae family described by Delaroche in 1809.

== Description ==
The rough ray is named for the spinules that cover its upper surface. In juveniles and males, these rough spinules are only on the snout and the lower half of the tail. The females of this species have spinules in these areas, but also around the mouth, along the mid-section, and the full tail. These spinules differ from the thorns that are on the inner-eye and from the end of the head to before the dorsal fin. There are two thorns between the dorsal fins.

The subcircular body has a short, curved snout, anterior edges are convex and the extremities are angular wings. Most individuals are around 70 centimeters. The main upper surface colors are light brown and grey, with darker spots and lines. There are two eye-spots with yellow rings and a thick outer darker ring with light dots, placed on either side of the spinal meridian at the level of greatest width of the body. The underside of the ray is white with darkening edges, and some darker spots on the tail. The upper and lower jaws have between 36-43 rows.

== Distribution and habitat ==
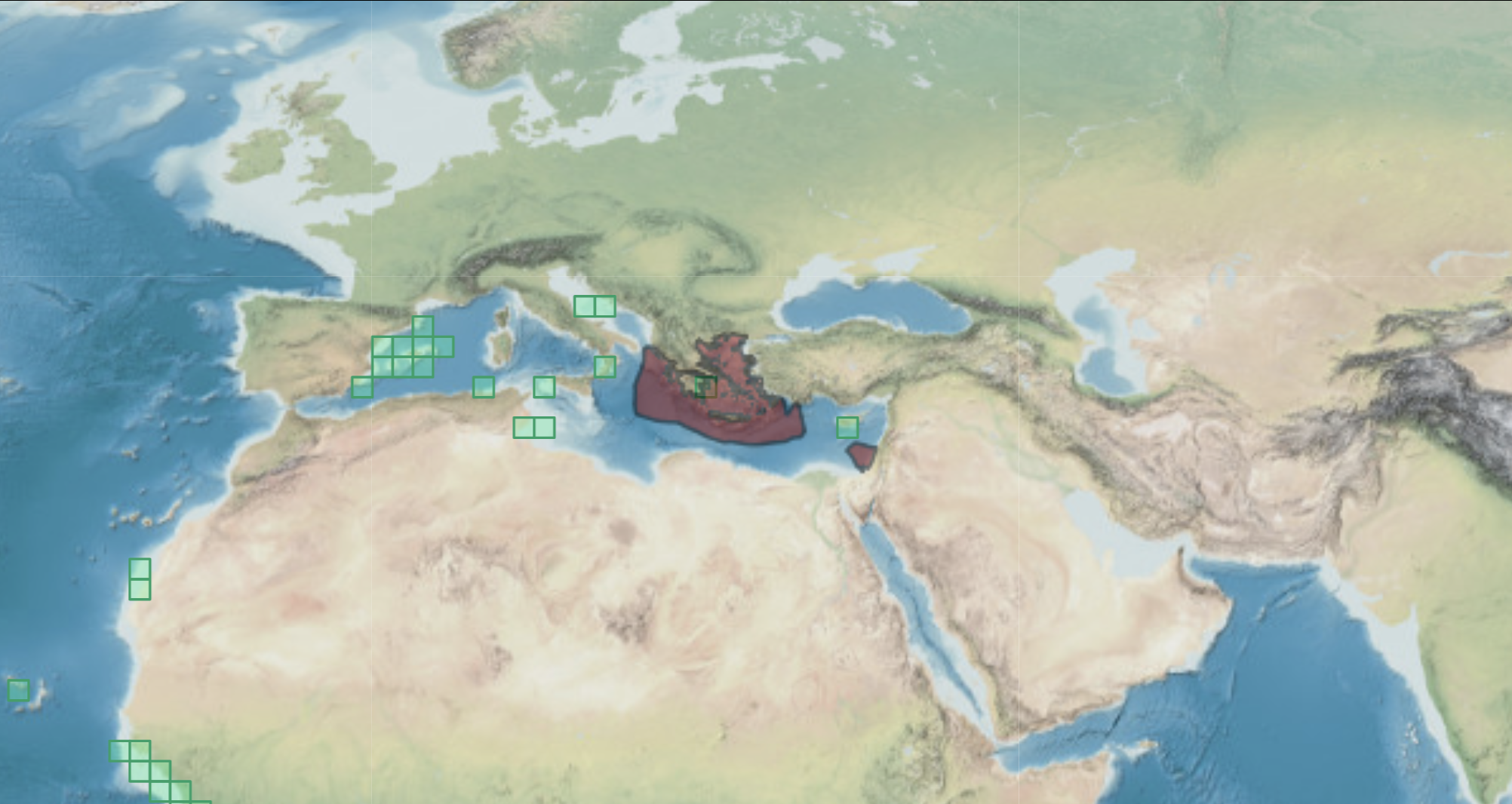
Raja radula distribution (in red).

Raja radula is a benthic species native to the Mediterranean Sea. Some Atlantic records are probably misidentifications of Leucoraja naevus and/or Raja africana and need to be clarified. This species inhabits coastal areas, between 2 and 300m depth on sandy or muddy bottoms of the continental shelf.

== Diet ==
This species seems to have short periods where they search for food and rapid digestion. Their diet consists mainly of benthic animals, such as crustaceans, teleosts, and mollusks. Indeed, their main prey are crustaceans, such as decapods or amphipods, and the second are teleosts. It was found that diet remained relatively similar between individuals of different sexes, however, the size of the individual led R. radula to move from the consumption of crustaceans to teleosts. The smaller individuals have a diet dominated by crustaceans as the medium size individuals. However, larger individuals seem to be specialized in teleosts. These changes in diet over their growth suggest that they have diet plasticity that can be explained by different energetic needs between younger and older individuals and as an adaptation to avoid competition for resources. Juveniles are active feeders during the day all over the year and have a higher metabolic rate than adults.

Moreover, there is a difference in diet depending on the geographic location. These differences in diet between locations can be explained by the different distribution, abundance, density, and availability of the prey. Reproductive migration is common in elasmobranchs, as a consequence, they occupy different niches that may result in diet diversification. Raja radula has an active predator foraging behavior. Some pelagic species are found in their stomach content even if their morphology suggests that they can not prey on the water column. Thus, the hypothesis is that they also present scavenger behavior. They are considered as specialized secondary consumers but with sufficient plasticity in the diet to adapt their consumption in the function of the preys available in the environment. Their trophic level may increase with their growth.

== Reproduction ==
Like many other rays, R. radula presents an oviparous reproduction strategy, meaning that parents produce offspring by laying eggs. The eggs have a case of 5.1 to 5.7 cm long. The embryos hatch in about 4 months. The total length at birth is between 5–6 centimetres (2.0–2.4 in). This species reproduces throughout the year, with a peak in late spring/early summer. The females and males become mature at different sizes: females are mature at 34 cm disc width and males at 30 cm disc width This species reproduces throughout the year, with a peak in late spring/early summer. The females and males become mature at different sizes: females are mature at 34 cm disc width and males at 30 cm disc width. Half of the maturity is reached at 4.47 years for male individuals and 5.89 years for female individuals. Females can live until 12 years and reach 80 cm total length maximum while males can live 9 years and reach 65 cm total length maximum. The average length of 70 cm is therefore estimated to be reached at 9 years.

== Locomotion ==
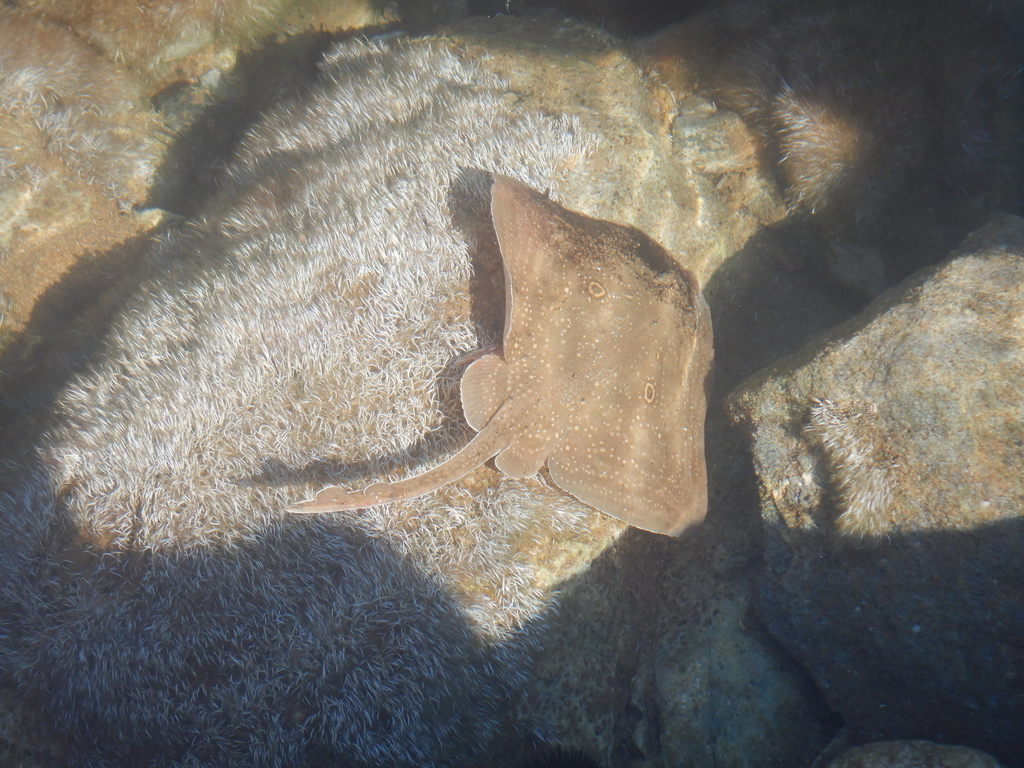
Raja radula on rocky bottoms.

Rays usually present a swimming mode, where the thrust generation involves the passing of undulatory waves (from anterior to posterior) along with the enlarged pectoral fins. However, this species presents a particular locomotion behavior: pelvic fin locomotion. The pelvic fin cycle has two phases: a recovery and a propulsion phase. Left and right fins move alternatively during the recovery and they move in synchrony when punting.

During the recovery phase, one of the pelvic fins lifts off the bottom and protrudes anteriorly; the other fin firmly touches the bottom during the propulsion phase. No vertical undulations of pectoral fins occurs during asynchronous movements of the pelvic fins and the species held its body parallel to the bottom. The ray performs a general form of punting: although the fins were not entirely synchronous, the offset was minimal, and therefore, still considered punting. The rough ray is pushed off the bottom by a rapid powerful punt followed by the pectoral fin undulations. Although the left and right pelvic fin movements can be slightly offset, the movements are generally considered synchronous punts.

== Conservation ==
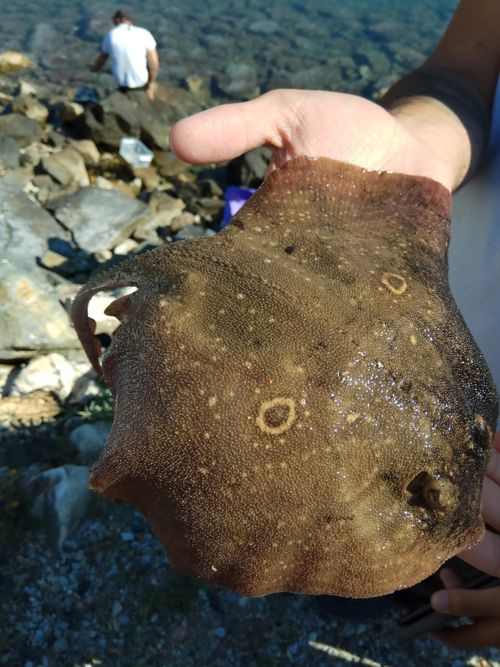
Specimen held by a person.

The Mediterranean sea is subject to many pressures that endanger its biodiversity, particularly by urbanization and overexploitation. Like other elasmobranch species, Raja radula represents an important catch in the Mediterranean sea even if this species does not have any commercial value. Even if this species is not exploited or traded commercially, it is classified as Endangered (EN) according to the IUCN Red List. Indeed, the greatest threat to this species is the by-catch in demersal trawl, gillnet, trammel net, bottom longline, and purse seine fisheries. This bycatch occurs when fishing for cuttlefish, spiny lobster, red mullet, grouper, and Sparidae mainly. In general, there are no conservation measures for this species. Indeed, it is not part of any education program, market control, or systematic monitoring scheme. Furthermore, data on this species are often limited because when it is fished, the term "rays" or "stake" are recorded in the registry, which does not allow the determination of which species are fished. However, a study has shown that it is the sixth most commercially traded elasmobranch species in Palma de Mallorca. This species is not registered in the CITES legislation from Species+ even when a decline of more than 50% is estimated. It is important to conduct further studies on this species to create accurate conservation programs for this endemic Mediterranean species.

== See also ==
- List of threatened rays
- List of cartilaginous fish § Superorder Batoidea
