= Kermadec spiny dogfish =

Conservation status
- Least Concern (IUCN 3.1)

Scientific classification
- Kingdom: Animalia
- Phylum: Chordata
- Class: Chondrichthyes
- Subclass: Elasmobranchii
- Division: Selachii
- Order: Squaliformes
- Family: Squalidae
- Genus: Squalus
- Species: S. raoulensis

Binomial name
- Squalus raoulensis Duffy & Last, 2007

Species of shark

The Kermadec spiny dogfish (Squalus raoulensis) is a dogfish described in 2007. It is a member of the family Squalidae, found off the Kermadec Islands. The length of the longest specimen measured is 68.1 cm (26.8 in).

In June 2018 the New Zealand Department of Conservation classified the Kermadec spiny dogfish as "Data Deficient" under the New Zealand Threat Classification System.
