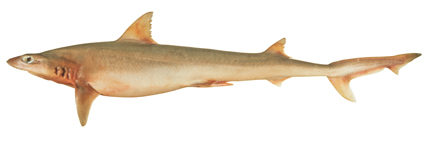

Conservation status
- Data Deficient (IUCN 3.1)

Scientific classification
- Kingdom: Animalia
- Phylum: Chordata
- Class: Chondrichthyes
- Subclass: Elasmobranchii
- Division: Selachii
- Order: Carcharhiniformes
- Family: Triakidae
- Genus: Hypogaleus; J. L. B. Smith, 1957
- Species: H. hyugaensis

Binomial name
- Hypogaleus hyugaensis (Miyosi, 1939)
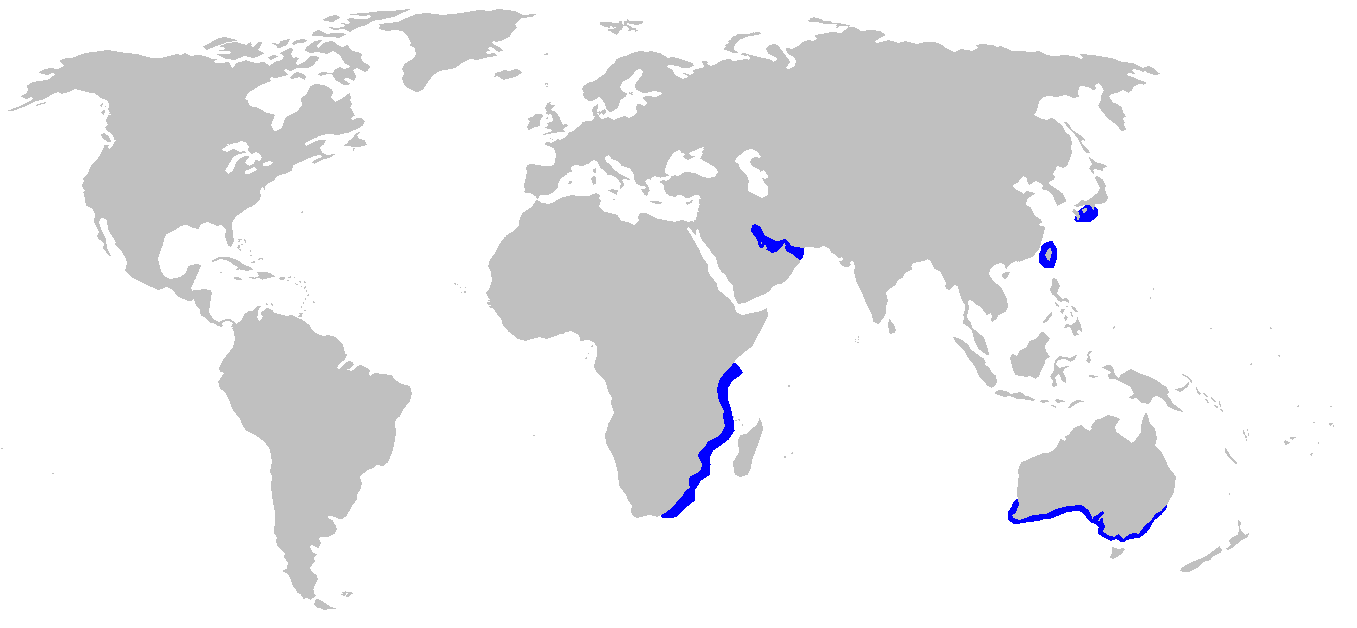

= Blacktip tope =

Species of shark

The blacktip tope (Hypogaleus hyugaensis), also known as pencil shark or blacktip topeshark, is a houndshark of the family Triakidae, and the only member of the genus Hypogaleus. It is found in the deep waters of the continental shelf in the Indo-West Pacific, from East Africa to Japan, at depths between 40 and 230 m (130 and 750 ft). It can grow up to a length of 1.27 m (4 ft 2 in).
