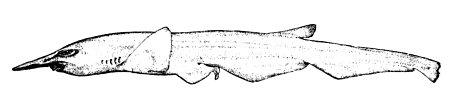

Conservation status
- Least Concern (IUCN 3.1)

Scientific classification
- Kingdom: Animalia
- Phylum: Chordata
- Class: Chondrichthyes
- Subclass: Elasmobranchii
- Division: Selachii
- Order: Carcharhiniformes
- Family: Pentanchidae
- Genus: Pentanchus; H. M. Smith & Radcliffe, 1912
- Species: P. profundicolus

Binomial name
- Pentanchus profundicolus H. M. Smith & Radcliffe, 1912
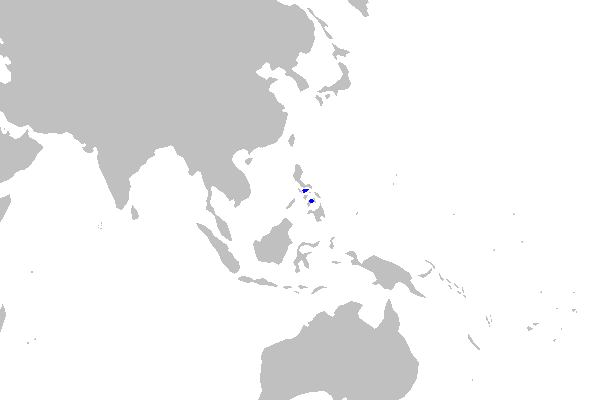
- Range of the onefin catshark

= Onefin catshark =

Species of shark

The onefin catshark (Pentanchus profundicolus) is a species of shark belonging to the family Pentanchidae, the deepwater catsharks. It is the only member of its genus, Pentanchus. It is known from two specimens collected from the Tablas Strait and Mindanao Sea off the Philippines in the Western Central Pacific. It is classified as harmless to humans and of least concern to the IUCN redlist.

== Description & behaviour ==
The Onefin catshark is a small, dark brown shark. It only has five pairs of gills and one dorsal fin near its tail. It has an elongated and flattened head which is pointed at the nose. Its anal fin is notably long - larger than the pelvic and dorsal fins. The caudal fin is also elongated. The maximum known length of the catshark is 51cm.

They tend to live between depths of 673m to 1069m.

== Etymology ==
The scientific name 'Pentanchus' is possibly a mix between the word penta, from the Greek pente meaning five, and anchus, a possible abridgment of the Greek branchos meaning gill. This would refer to the five pairs of gills the shark has, which would make the shark unique if it were a hexanchoid - the authors mistakenly believed this to be the case.
