= Fanfin skate =

Conservation status
- Least Concern (IUCN 3.1)

Scientific classification
- Kingdom: Animalia
- Phylum: Chordata
- Class: Chondrichthyes
- Subclass: Elasmobranchii
- Order: Rajiformes
- Family: Arhynchobatidae
- Genus: Pseudoraja; Bigelow & Schroeder, 1954
- Species: P. fischeri

Binomial name
- Pseudoraja fischeri Bigelow & Schroeder, 1954

Species of cartilaginous fish

The fanfin skate (Pseudoraja fischeri) is a species of skate in the family Arhynchobatidae. It is the only species in the monotypic genus Pseudoraja. This pelagic skate occurs in the Atlantic Ocean from Florida and through the Gulf of Mexico to Honduras.
