= Sailback houndshark =

Conservation status
- Data Deficient (IUCN 3.1)

Scientific classification
- Kingdom: Animalia
- Phylum: Chordata
- Class: Chondrichthyes
- Subclass: Elasmobranchii
- Division: Selachii
- Order: Carcharhiniformes
- Family: Triakidae
- Genus: Gogolia; Compagno, 1973
- Species: G. filewoodi

Binomial name
- Gogolia filewoodi Compagno, 1973
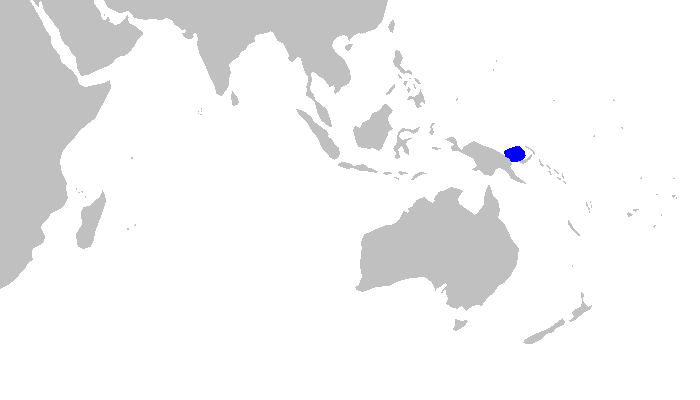

Species of shark

The sailback houndshark (Gogolia filewoodi) is a houndshark of the family Triakidae, and the only member of the genus Gogolia. It is found in the deep waters of continental shelf off northern Papua New Guinea. Only one specimen has been found, at a depth of 73 m (240 ft). It measured 74 cm (29 in) in length. The reproduction of this shark is ovoviviparous.
