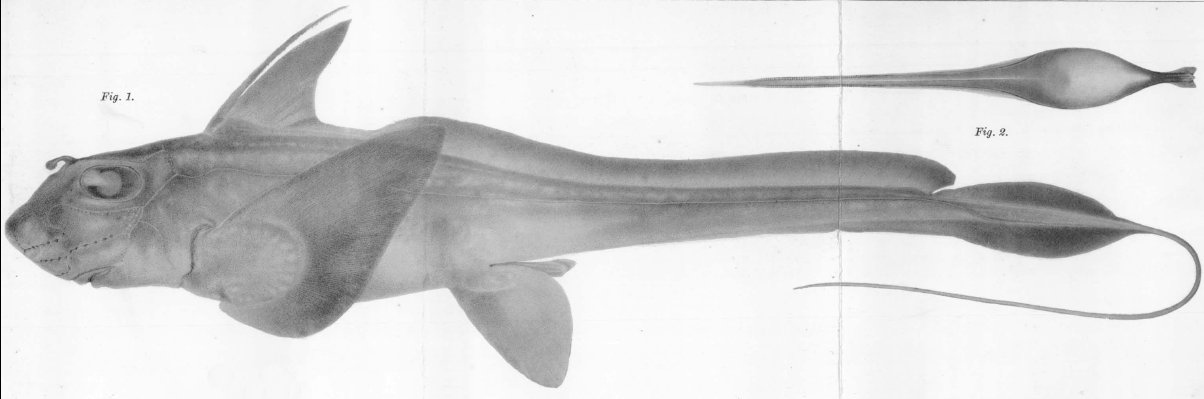

Conservation status
- Near Threatened (IUCN 3.1)

Scientific classification
- Kingdom: Animalia
- Phylum: Chordata
- Class: Chondrichthyes
- Subclass: Holocephali
- Order: Chimaeriformes
- Family: Chimaeridae
- Genus: Hydrolagus
- Species: H. mitsukurii

Binomial name
- Hydrolagus mitsukurii (D. S. Jordan & Snyder, 1904)

Synonyms
- List: Chimaera mitsukurii (Jordan & Snyder, 1904); Chimaera mitsukurii (Dean, 1904); Psyschichthys mitsukirii (Dean, 1904)

= Hydrolagus mitsukurii =

Species of fish

Hydrolagus mitsukurii is a species of fish in the family Chimaeridae found in China, Japan, South Korea, the Philippines, Taiwan, and possibly Indonesia. Its natural habitat is open seas. It is one of several species commonly called "spookfish".
