= Zanzibar guitarfish =

Conservation status
- Near Threatened (IUCN 3.1)

Scientific classification
- Kingdom: Animalia
- Phylum: Chordata
- Class: Chondrichthyes
- Subclass: Elasmobranchii
- Order: Rhinopristiformes
- Family: Rhinobatidae
- Genus: Acroteriobatus
- Species: A. zanzibarensis

Binomial name
- Acroteriobatus zanzibarensis (Norman, 1926)

Synonyms
- Rhinobatos zanzibarensis Norman, 1926

Species of cartilaginous fish

The Zanzibar guitarfish (Acroteriobatus zanzibarensis, formerly Rhinobatos zanzibarensis) is a species of fish in the Rhinobatidae family endemic to Tanzania. Its natural habitats are open seas and shallow seas.
