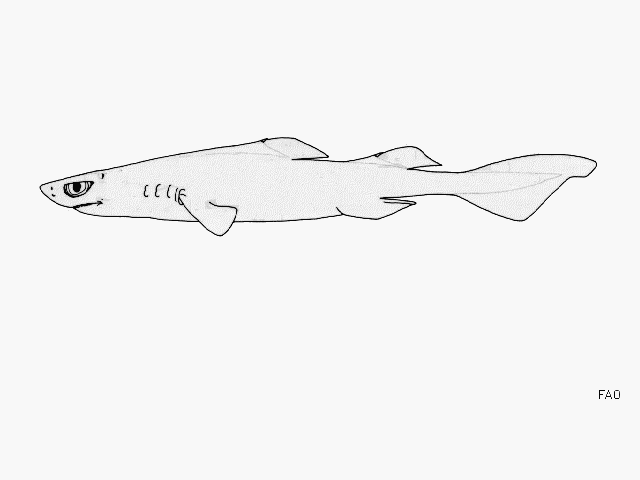

Conservation status
- Near Threatened (IUCN 3.1)

Scientific classification
- Kingdom: Animalia
- Phylum: Chordata
- Class: Chondrichthyes
- Subclass: Elasmobranchii
- Division: Selachii
- Order: Squaliformes
- Family: Etmopteridae
- Genus: Aculeola; F. de Buen, 1959
- Species: A. nigra

Binomial name
- Aculeola nigra F. de Buen, 1959
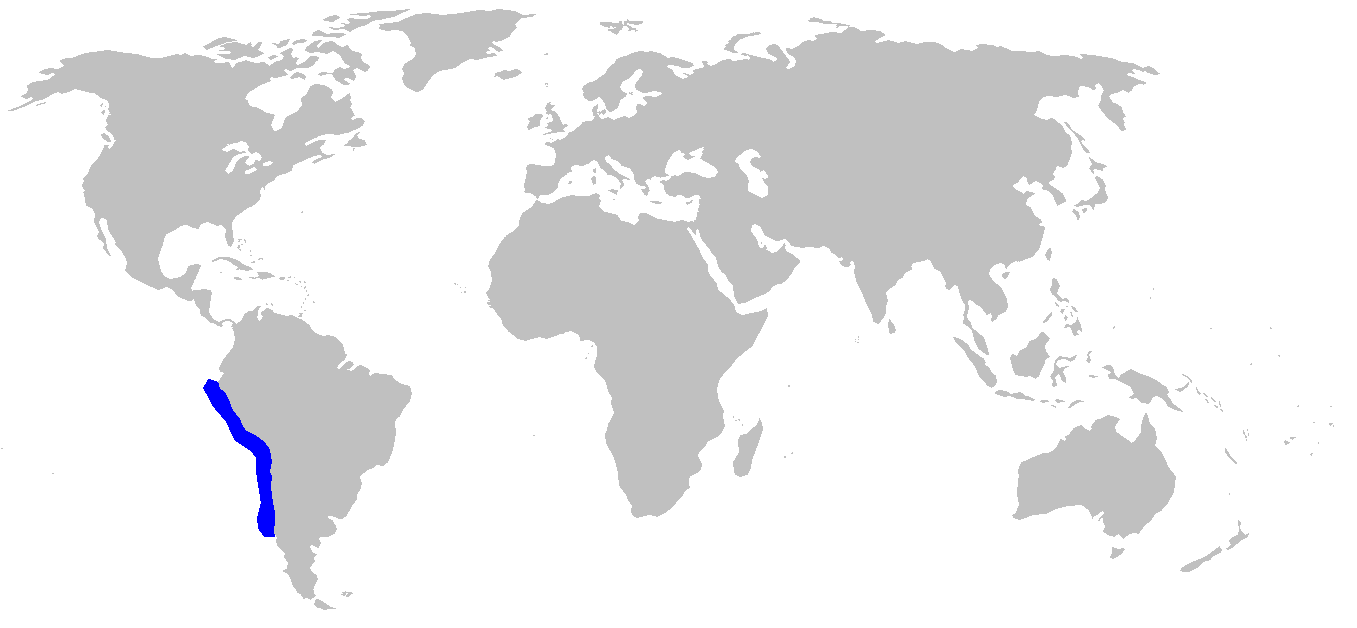
- Range of hooktooth dogfish (in blue)

= Hooktooth dogfish =

Species of shark

The hooktooth dogfish (Aculeola nigra) is a small, little-known dogfish, the only member of the genus Aculeola.

The type specimen is held at the National Natural History Museum, Santiago, Chile.

== Description ==
The hooktooth dogfish has a blunt, flattened snout, very large eyes, a relatively long distance from the eye to the first gill slit, small grooved dorsal spines, a first dorsal fin about halfway between the pectoral and pelvic fins, and a broad caudal fin. They are black with a maximum length of only 60 cm.

== Distribution ==
They are found in the eastern South Pacific along the coast of South America from Peru to central Chile.

== Habits and habitat ==
This shark is a little-known, yet common, shark that lives at depths between 110 and 560 m. They are ovoviviparous, with at least three pups per litter. They probably eat bony fish and invertebrates.
