= Tarsistes =

Scientific classification
- Kingdom: Animalia
- Phylum: Chordata
- Class: Chondrichthyes
- Subclass: Elasmobranchii
- Order: Rhinopristiformes
- Family: Rhinobatidae
- Genus: Tarsistes; D. S. Jordan, 1919
- Species: T. philippii

Binomial name
- Tarsistes philippii D. S. Jordan, 1919

Possible species of cartilaginous fish

Tarsistes philippii is a taxonomically dubious species of guitarfish, family Rhinobatidae. It is known only from a dried head from the Juan Fernández Islands off Chile. The head had a long, thin, flat snout, rounded at the tip like that of the goblin shark, and the underside covered with small stellate prickles except for the base. The head was covered with larger spinules, with six still larger ones forming a curve around the eye.

The original specimen was assigned to the genus Rhynchobatis without a species name by Philippi in 1858; David Starr Jordan considered that genus name preoccupied (by Rhynchobatus) and coined the new scientific name Tarsistes philippii for it in 1919. However, the holotype has never been studied or described since, so the status of this species is uncertain. In their revision of the generic alpha-taxonomy of Rhinobatidae, Last et al. (2016) considered Tarsistes a possible synonym of Pseudobatos.
