= Rough cownose ray =

Scientific classification
- Kingdom: Animalia
- Phylum: Chordata
- Class: Chondrichthyes
- Subclass: Elasmobranchii
- Order: Myliobatiformes
- Family: Rhinopteridae
- Genus: Rhinoptera
- Species: R. adspersa

Binomial name
- Rhinoptera adspersa Müller & Henle, 1841

Species of cartilaginous fish

The rough cownose ray (Rhinoptera adspersa) is a species of eagle ray in the genus Rhinoptera.

== Distribution ==
The species occurs in the Indo-West Pacific off India, Malaysia, and the East Indies. The validity of this species is questioned though in Compagno's 1999 checklist.

It is also found off the coast of Ajman, United Arab Emirates, as mentioned in a picture of this species in Ajman Museum (which is located in the Emirate of Ajman) as follows: (غُرابي, Rhinopetra adspersa, eagle ray).

== Description ==
Its maximum length is 99 cm (39 in).
