= Clinton A. J. Duffy =

New Zealand marine scientist

- Born: c.1966 (age 59–60)
- Education: University of Canterbury (BSc, MSc)
- Occupation: marine scientist
- Employer: Department of Conservation (New Zealand)
- Known for: shark expert
- Notable work: surveying basking sharks
- Children: Thomas Duffy, Caitlin Duffy

External image
- Clinton holding a small Spotted Smoothhound Australian Museum

Clinton Anthony John Duffy (born c. 1966) is a New Zealand marine scientist, who works in the Marine Conservation Unit of the Department of Conservation. Duffy is a shark expert, whose work includes the taxonomy and conservation status of New Zealand's deepwater dogfishes, attaching GPS wildlife tracking devices to great white sharks, and surveying basking sharks.

He performed the public dissection of a great white shark at the Auckland Museum in 2009.

Duffy has BSc and MSc degrees from the University of Canterbury.
