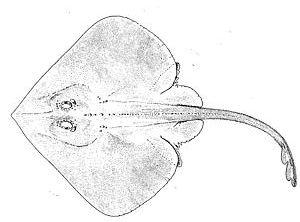
- Smooth skate, Malacoraja senta

Scientific classification
- Kingdom: Animalia
- Phylum: Chordata
- Class: Chondrichthyes
- Subclass: Elasmobranchii
- Order: Rajiformes
- Family: Rajidae
- Genus: Malacoraja; Stehmann, 1970

Type species
- Raja mollis Bigelow & Schroeder, 1950

= Malacoraja =

Genus of cartilaginous fishes

Malacoraja, or soft skates, is a small genus of skates in the family Rajidae found at depths of 46–1,568 m (151–5,144 ft) in the Atlantic. It currently consists of four described species, as well as a possible undescribed species.

== Species ==
- Malacoraja kreffti (Stehmann, 1978) (Krefft's skate)
- Malacoraja obscura M. R. de Carvalho, U. L. Gomes & Gadig, 2005 (Brazilian soft skate)
- Malacoraja senta (Garman, 1885) (Smooth skate)
- Malacoraja spinacidermis (Barnard, 1923) (Soft skate)
