= Salalah guitarfish =

Conservation status
- Near Threatened (IUCN 3.1)

Scientific classification
- Kingdom: Animalia
- Phylum: Chordata
- Class: Chondrichthyes
- Subclass: Elasmobranchii
- Order: Rhinopristiformes
- Family: Rhinobatidae
- Genus: Acroteriobatus
- Species: A. salalah

Binomial name
- Acroteriobatus salalah (J. E. Randall & Compagno, 1995)

Synonyms
- Rhinobatos salalah

Species of cartilaginous fish

The Salalah guitarfish (Acroteriobatus salalah) is a species of fish in the family Rhinobatidae. It is nearly endemic to the waters off Oman, with a few records off Pakistan. Its natural habitat is open seas.

Salalah (صَلَالَة Ṣalālah) is a city in southern Oman where the only specimen was obtained at a fish market.
