= List of chimaeras =

Chimaeras (Chimaeriformes) are cartilaginous fish belonging to the subclass Holocephali, in the class Chondrichthyes, distantly related to sharks and rays (Elasmobranchii). Listed below are extant species of chimaera. Chimaera diversity is spread across more than 50 species in six genera, three families, and one order. The families and genera within the orders are listed in alphabetical order.

- Order Chimaeriformes
  - Family Callorhinchidae (Plough-nose chimaeras)
    - Genus Callorhinchus
      - Callorhinchus callorynchus Linnaeus, 1758 (Ploughnose chimaera)
      - Callorhinchus capensis A. H. A. Duméril, 1865 (Cape elephantfish)
      - Callorhinchus milii Bory de Saint-Vincent, 1823 (Australian ghostshark)
  - Family Chimaeridae (Shortnose chimaeras)
    - Genus Chimaera
      - Chimaera argiloba Last, W. T. White & Pogonoski, 2008 (Whitefin chimaera)
      - Chimaera bahamaensis Kemper, Ebert, Didier & Compagno, 2010 (Bahamas ghost shark)
      - Chimaera buccaginella Clerkin, Elbert, & Kemper, 2017 (Dark-mouth chimaera)
      - Chimaera carophila Kemper, Ebert, Naylor & Didier, 2014 (Brown chimaera)
      - Chimaera compacta Iglésias, Kemper & Naylor, 2022 (Stubby chimaera)
      - Chimaera cubana Howell-Rivero, 1936 (Cuban chimaera)
      - Chimaera didierae Clerkin, Elbert, & Kemper, 2017 (Falkor chimaera)
      - Chimaera fulva Didier, Last & W. T. White, 2008 (Southern chimaera)
      - Chimaera jordani S. Tanaka (I), 1905 (Jordan's chimaera)
      - Chimaera lignaria Didier, 2002 (Carpenter's chimaera)
      - Chimaera macrospina Didier, Last & W. T. White, 2008 (Longspine chimaera)
      - Chimaera monstrosa Linnaeus, 1758 (Rabbit fish)
      - Chimaera notafricana Kemper, Ebert, Compagno & Didier, 2010 (Cape chimaera)
      - Chimaera obscura Didier, Last & W. T. White, 2008 (Shortspine chimaera)
      - Chimaera ogilbyi Waite, 1898 (Ogilby's ghostshark)
      - Chimaera opalescens Luchetti, Iglésias & Sellos, 2011 (Opal chimaera)
      - Chimaera orientalis Angulo, M. I. Bussing, W. A. Bussing & Murase, 2014 (Eastern Pacific black chimaera)
      - Chimaera owstoni S. Tanaka (I), 1905 (Owston's chimaera)
      - Chimaera panthera Didier, 1998 (Leopard chimaera)
      - Chimaera phantasma D. S. Jordan & Snyder, 1900 (Silver chimaera)
      - Chimaera willwatchi Clerkin, Elbert, & Kemper, 2017 (Seafarer ghostshark)
    - Genus Hydrolagus
      - Hydrolagus affinis Brito Capello, 1868 (Small-eyed rabbitfish)
      - Hydrolagus africanus Gilchrist, 1922 (African chimaera)
      - Hydrolagus alberti Bigelow & Schroeder, 1951 (Gulf chimaera)
      - Hydrolagus alphus Quaranta, Didier, Long & Ebert, 2006 (Whitespot ghostshark)
      - Hydrolagus barbouri Garman, 1908 (Ninespot chimaera)
      - Hydrolagus bemisi Didier, 2002 (Pale ghost shark)
      - Hydrolagus colliei Lay & E. T. Bennett, 1839 (Spotted ratfish)
      - Hydrolagus deani H. M. Smith & Radcliffe, 1912 (Philippine chimaera)
      - Hydrolagus eidolon D. S. Jordan & C. L. Hubbs, 1925
      - Hydrolagus erithacus Walovich, Elbert, & Kemper, 2017 (Robin's ghostshark)
      - Hydrolagus homonycteris Didier, 2008 (Black ghostshark)
      - Hydrolagus lemures Whitley, 1939 (Bight ghostshark)
      - Hydrolagus lusitanicus T. Moura, I. M. R. Figueiredo, Bordalo-Machado, C. Almeida & Gordo, 2005 (Portuguese rabbitfish)
      - Hydrolagus macrophthalmus F. de Buen, 1959 (Bigeye chimaera)
      - Hydrolagus marmoratus Didier, 2008 (Marbled ghostshark)
      - Hydrolagus matallanasi Soto & Vooren, 2004 (Striped rabbitfish)
      - Hydrolagus mccoskeri L. A. K. Barnett, Didier, Long & Ebert, 2006 (Galápagos ghostshark)
      - Hydrolagus melanophasma K. C. James, Ebert, Long & Didier, 2009 (Eastern Pacific black ghostshark)
      - Hydrolagus mirabilis Collett, 1904 (Large-eyed rabbitfish)
      - Hydrolagus mitsukurii D. S. Jordan & Snyder, 1904 (Spookfish)
      - Hydrolagus novaezealandiae Fowler, 1911 (Dark ghostshark)
      - Hydrolagus pallidus Hardy & Stehmann, 1990 (Pale chimaera)
      - Hydrolagus purpurescens C. H. Gilbert, 1905 (Purple chimaera)
      - Hydrolagus trolli Didier & Séret, 2002 (Pointy-nosed blue chimaera)
  - Family Rhinochimaeridae (Long-nosed chimaeras)
    - Genus Harriotta
      - Harriotta haeckeli Karrer, 1972 (Smallspine spookfish)
      - Harriotta raleighana Goode & Bean, 1895 (Narrownose chimaera)
    - Genus Neoharriotta
      - Neoharriotta carri Bullis & J. S. Carpenter, 1966 (Dwarf sicklefin chimaera)
      - Neoharriotta pinnata Schnakenbeck, 1931 (Sicklefin chimaera)
      - Neoharriotta pumila Didier & Stehmann, 1996 (Arabian sicklefin chimaera)
    - Genus Rhinochimaera
      - Rhinochimaera africana Compagno, Stehmann & Ebert, 1990 (Paddlenose chimaera)
      - Rhinochimaera atlantica Holt & Byrne, 1909 (Broadnose chimaera)
      - Rhinochimaera costaricana Vidaurre-Quesada, Salas-Jimenez, Carvajal-Rodriguez, Lara-Quesada, Santos, Araripe & Angulo, 2026 (Costa Rican longnose chimaera)
      - Rhinochimaera pacifica Mitsukuri, 1895 (Pacific spookfish)

== See also ==
- List of prehistoric cartilaginous fish genera
- List of sharks
