= Spookfish =

Spookfish may refer to:

- Barreleye, a family of bony fish
  - Brownsnout spookfish Dolichopteryx longipes, a species that uses mirrors in its eyes, one of the only known animals to have this function
  - Javelin spookfish Bathylychnops exilis
- Several species of Chimaera, an order of cartilagenous fish
  - Australasian narrownosed spookfish Harriotta avia
  - Smallspine spookfish Harriotta haeckeli
  - Narrownose spookfish Harriotta raleighana
  - Hydrolagus mitsukurii
  - Paddlenose spookfish Rhinochimaera africana
  - Pacific spookfish Rhinochimaera pacifica
