= Narrowhead catshark =

Conservation status
- Least Concern (IUCN 3.1)

Scientific classification
- Kingdom: Animalia
- Phylum: Chordata
- Class: Chondrichthyes
- Subclass: Elasmobranchii
- Division: Selachii
- Order: Carcharhiniformes
- Family: Pentanchidae
- Genus: Bythaelurus
- Species: B. tenuicephalus

Binomial name
- Bythaelurus tenuicephalus Kaschner, Weigmann & Thiel, 2015

Species of shark

The narrowhead catshark (Bythaelurus tenuicephalus) is a species of shark belonging to the family Pentanchidae, the deepwater catsharks. This species is described based on one adult and one juvenile male specimen from off Tanzania and Mozambique in the western Indian Ocean. The species differs from its congeners by its slender head and snout, which is only slightly bell-shaped in dorsoventral view without distinct lateral indention. It further differs from B. clevai by attaining a smaller maximum size and having a color pattern of fewer and smaller blotches, larger oral papillae, a shorter snout, and broader claspers without knob-like apex and with a smaller envelope and a subtriangular exorhipidion. Compared to B. hispidus, the species has a longer snout, a longer dorsal-caudal space, broader clasper without knob-like apex, and fewer vertebral centra. In contrast to B. lutarius, B. tenuicephalus attains a smaller size and has a blotched coloration, numerous oral papillae, shorter anterior nasal flaps, a longer caudal fin, a shorter pelvic anal space, and shorter and broader claspers.
