= Rhinochimaera costaricana =

Scientific classification
- Kingdom: Animalia
- Phylum: Chordata
- Class: Chondrichthyes
- Subclass: Holocephali
- Order: Chimaeriformes
- Family: Rhinochimaeridae
- Genus: Rhinochimaera
- Species: R. costaricana

Binomial name
- Rhinochimaera costaricana (Vidaurre-Quesada et al., 2026)

Species of chimaera

Rhinochimaera costaricana, commonly known as the Costa Rican longnose chimaera, or Eastern Pacific paddlenose chimaera is a species of chimaera in the family Rhinochimaeridae. It is informally referred to in the popular press as the Costa Rican ghost shark, a colloquial name applied broadly to chimaeras. It is the first species of the genus Rhinochimaera to be described from the Eastern Pacific Ocean and the fourth recognized species in the genus worldwide.

== Discovery and taxonomy ==
Rhinochimaera costaricana was formally described in June 2026 in the scientific journal Zootaxa by a team of researchers from Costa Rica's Fisheries and Aquaculture Institute (INCOPESCA), the University of Costa Rica, and Brazil's Federal University of Pará. The lead author was Naidely Valeria Vidaurre Quesada, a biology student at the University of Costa Rica.

The species was based on three male specimens collected off the Pacific coast of Costa Rica between 2000 and 2023. The first specimen was collected in 2000 near Isla del Caño, while the other two were obtained in 2023 off Cabo Blanco, Puntarenas. All specimens were obtained as bycatch during fisheries surveys and subsequently preserved for study.

Prior to this description, the genus Rhinochimaera contained only three recognized species worldwide: R. africana, R. atlantica, and R. pacifica. R. costaricana is the first member of the genus formally identified from the Eastern Pacific.

The holotype (UCR: 3370–001) is a male specimen of 783 mm total length. The two paratypes are catalogued as UCR: 2612-001 and UCR: 3369-001 and are deposited at the University of Costa Rica.

== Description ==
Rhinochimaera costaricana has a total length ranging from 775 to 830 mm in the known type series, all of which are male. Like other members of its genus, it possesses an elongated, paddle-shaped snout with numerous sensory nerve endings. However, its snout is proportionally shorter than those of its congeners.

It is distinguished from all other Rhinochimaera species by a unique combination of traits: a shorter snout, a larger and taller first dorsal-fin spine, a higher first dorsal fin, a wider interdorsal space, and a reduced number of tubercles along the caudal region. The body is dark brown in color, with the fins approaching nearly black.

A total of 49 morphometric measurements from the three type specimens were compared against published and unpublished data from more than 90 individuals representing the three previously recognized Rhinochimaera species, confirming the distinctiveness of the Costa Rican specimens.

== Genetics ==
Molecular analyses of COI sequences from two specimens of R. costaricana revealed genetic divergences of 3.9% from R. africana, 4.5% from R. atlantica, and 4.7% from R. pacifica, all exceeding the commonly accepted threshold for interspecific divergence. Species delimitation methods—including ASAP, bPTP, and GMYC—likewise supported the recognition of this taxon as a species distinct from all congeners.

== Distribution ==
Rhinochimaera costaricana is known from the Eastern Pacific Ocean, off the Pacific coast of Costa Rica. Specimens have been collected near Isla del Caño and off Cabo Blanco in Puntarenas Province. It has been found at depths ranging from 390 to 787 m (approximately 1,280 to 2,580 ft). All specimens were captured as bycatch during fisheries surveys, suggesting the species may be more widely distributed in the deep waters of the Eastern Pacific than the current limited records indicate.

== Conservation status ==
Rhinochimaera costaricana has not yet been assessed by the IUCN. Its conservation status is currently unknown due to the limited number of known specimens and the lack of data on population size, range, and threats. The species is only known from bycatch, indicating that it is not targeted by commercial fisheries, though incidental capture in deep-water trawls may pose a potential threat.
