= Harriotta avia =

Scientific classification
- Kingdom: Animalia
- Phylum: Chordata
- Class: Chondrichthyes
- Subclass: Holocephali
- Order: Chimaeriformes
- Family: Rhinochimaeridae
- Genus: Harriotta
- Species: H. avia

Binomial name
- Harriotta avia Finucci, Didier, Ebert, Green, & Kemper, 2024

Species of chimaera

Harriotta avia, the Australasian narrow-nosed spookfish, is a type of chimaera of the family Rhinochimaeridae identified from several specimens found in New Zealand, Southwest Pacific Ocean. Its distribution range is now believed to be New Zealand and Australia.

== Description ==
As with other chimaeras, Harriotta avia has a cartilaginous skeleton, no scales, and smooth skin. Harriotta avia is distinguished from its congeners (Harriotta raleighana and Harriotta haeckeli) by several characteristics, including elongated slender trunk, slim rod-like pelvic claspers, dorsal spine going beyond the dorsal fin's apex, and long thin snout up to 56% of its body length. This elongate rostrum may serve sensory purposes.

This species maximum total length is around 107.5 cm for female specimens and 95.7 cm for male specimens. Morphological characteristics include pale brown and yellow colors, the dorsal fin is primarily brown and sometimes even slightly purple while the edges of most fins are a darker brown, whereas the majority of the body stays a light brown and white. The head consists of large horizontally oval eyes and a long-extended rostrum that tapers to a sharp extended tip, this snout holds mucous canals down most of the snout. The gills have prominent posterior flaps that extend outwards and form a short tube with the back end of the gill covers. Harriotta avia possesses a narrow and short mouth with a deep lower lip. Sexual dimorphism is observable through fully grown species as males tend to have larger heads and snouts than females.

== Distribution and habitat ==
It is suggested that Harriotta avia lives at a depth of 260–1278 m, although 400–1000 m might be a closer possibility. Ghost sharks live on the ocean floor. They are found on the continental slope of New Zealand. This includes the Chatham rise where specimens were collected, as well as ridges and seamounts in the Tasman Sea.

== Conservation ==
Harriotta avia is listed as least concern on the IUCN Red List as of 2024. The depth which Harriotta avia and other chimaeras are found makes them difficult to study and monitor.

== Etymology ==
The genus Harriotta honors Thomas Harriott. The species name avia means grandmother in Latin and was named by Brittany Finucci in honor of her grandmother, June Thomas. The name grandmother was also deemed fitting as chimaeras are ancestral relative to fish evolution.

== Molecular analysis ==
Using maximum likelihood tree topology at the NADH2 locus allowed the scientists to distinguish Harriota avia from two other species, being Harriotta haeckeli, and Harriotta raleighana. H. avia was discovered as a sister species to H. raleighana, as they found slight divergence from terminal clades whereas there was not much divergence in clades. Lack of hybridization helps separate these species clades.
