= Dusky snout catshark =

Conservation status
- Data Deficient (IUCN 3.1)

Scientific classification
- Kingdom: Animalia
- Phylum: Chordata
- Class: Chondrichthyes
- Subclass: Elasmobranchii
- Division: Selachii
- Order: Carcharhiniformes
- Family: Pentanchidae
- Genus: Bythaelurus
- Species: B. naylori

Binomial name
- Bythaelurus naylori Ebert & Clerkin, 2015

Species of shark

The dusky snout catshark (Bythaelurus naylori) is a species of shark belonging to the family Pentanchidae, the deepwater catsharks. This species is found from the Southwest Indian Ridge, southwestern Indian Ocean. The specimens were collected from 89–1,443 m (292–4,734 ft) depth in both bottom trawls and midwater trawls. The shallowest catch record of the new species, possibly at 89 m (292 ft), came from a midwater trawl. This species can be distinguished from its two closest congeners, B. giddingsi and B. lutarius, by a combination of prominent comb-like dermal denticles along the upper caudal-fin margin, absence of oral papillae, uniform body coloration, and noticeable dark dusky snout; Bythaelurus giddingsi has oral papillae present and a variegated color pattern, while B. lutarius lacks a caudal crest of enlarged denticles and matures at a much smaller size than the new species.
