= Harriotta lehmani =

Scientific classification
- Kingdom: Animalia
- Phylum: Chordata
- Class: Chondrichthyes
- Subclass: Holocephali
- Order: Chimaeriformes
- Family: Rhinochimaeridae
- Genus: Harriotta
- Species: †H. lehmani

Binomial name
- †Harriotta lehmani Werdelin, 1986

Extinct species of cartilaginous fish

Harriotta lehmani is an extinct species of ghost shark from the genus Harriotta. This fossil fish fills a gap in chimaeroids in the Cretaceous fish beds of Lebanon. It was first discovered by a French Expedition in 1946. The distinguishing characteristics include a paired cartilage structure in the rostrum as well as two dorsal fins. The skull structure of Harriotta lehmani reflects the structure of Rhinochimaeridae family and it has a plate in the jaw palate similar to the modern Harriotta genus.
