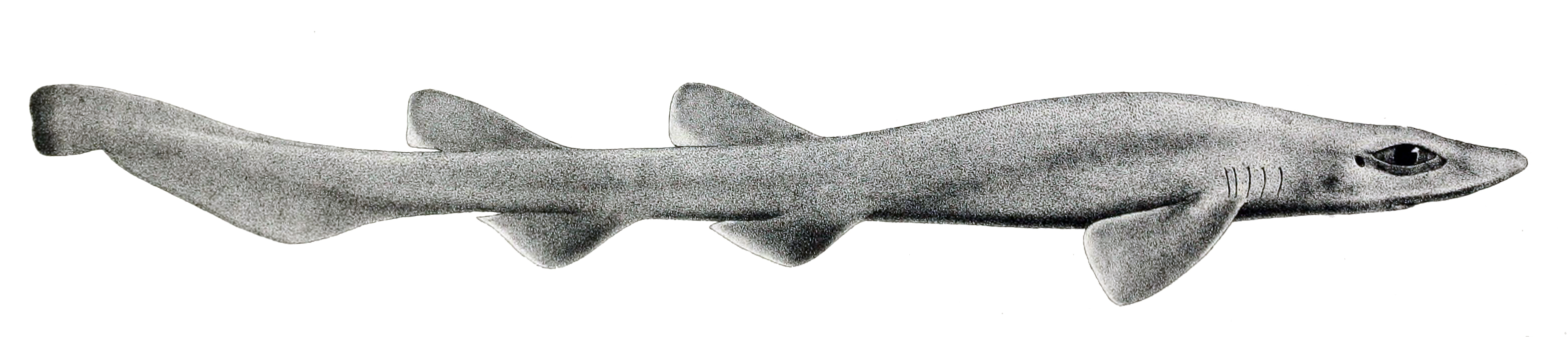
- Dusky catshark (Bythaelurus canescens)

Scientific classification
- Kingdom: Animalia
- Phylum: Chordata
- Class: Chondrichthyes
- Subclass: Elasmobranchii
- Division: Selachii
- Order: Carcharhiniformes
- Family: Pentanchidae
- Genus: Bythaelurus; L. J. V. Compagno, 1988

Type species
- Scyllium canescens Günther, 1878

= Bythaelurus =

Bythaelurus Temporal range: Early Oligocene to present

Genus of sharks

Bythaelurus is a genus of sharks belonging to the family Pentanchidae, the deepwater catsharks. The genus Bythaelurus Compagno 1988 was first described as a subgenus of Halaelurus Gill 1862 based on several morphological characteristics including a soft body with thin skin, a bluntly rounded snout without a pointed, knob-like tip, and eyes not noticeably elevated on the dorsal surface of the head. Members of this genus are generally found in deep water and have more somber body coloration.

== Species ==
There are currently 14 recognized species in this genus:

- Bythaelurus alcockii (Garman, 1913) (Arabian catshark)
- Bythaelurus bachi Weigmann et al., 2016 (Bach's catshark)
- Bythaelurus canescens (Günther, 1878) (dusky catshark)
- Bythaelurus clevai (Séret, 1987) (broadhead catshark)
- Bythaelurus dawsoni (S. Springer, 1971) (New Zealand catshark)
- Bythaelurus giddingsi J. E. McCosker, Long & C. C. Baldwin, 2012 (Galápagos catshark)
- Bythaelurus hispidus (Alcock, 1891) (bristly catshark)
- Bythaelurus immaculatus (Y. T. Chu & Q. W. Meng, 1982) (spotless catshark)
- Bythaelurus incanus Last & J. D. Stevens, 2008 (sombre catshark)
- Bythaelurus lutarius (S. Springer & D'Aubrey, 1972) (mud catshark)
- Bythaelurus naylori Ebert & Clerkin, 2015 (dusky snout catshark)
- Bythaelurus stewarti Weigmann, Kaschner, and Thiel, 2018 (Error Seamount catshark)
- Bythaelurus tenuicephalus Kaschner, Weigmann & Thiel, 2015 (narrowhead catshark)
- Bythaelurus vivaldii Weigmann & Kaschner, 2017 (Vivaldi's catshark)

A single fossil species, †Bythelurus steurbauti Hovestadt & Hovestadt-Euler, 1995 is known from the Early Oligocene of Belgium.
