= McCusker =

McCusker is a surname of Gaelic origin used predominantly in Ulster (Fermanagh, Tyrone, Londonderry, and Armagh). Often interchangeable with Cosgrove, which was more common in parts of Armagh and in Cavan and Longford.

McCusker, Cosgrove and other similar surnames are anglicisations of the Gaelic surnames of a number of unrelated Gaelic families of Ulster, including the:

- Mac Giolla Coisgle or Mac Giolla Coisgli or more modernly Mac Giolla Choiscle, an old Barony of Tirkennedy, Fermanagh family. Brehons (both Irish and canon law), Harpists, Erenaghs of Derrybrusk in Fermanagh, high ranking churchmen in the Dioceses of Clogher and Armagh including abbots, culdees, canon choral, canons, vicars, priests, lawyers and husbandmen (anglicised to McCusker, McCosker, Cosgrove, McCosgrove, Cuskery, McCuskey, Cuskelly, McCloskey and others). Spread through South Ulster (Fermanagh, Tyrone and Armagh) and Westmeath/Offaly branch.

- Mac Coscraigh, Erenaghs of part of the lands of the Abbey of Clones, Clones Civil Parish, Monaghan

- Mac Oscar of Magheracross and Derryvullan, Fermanagh and later Dromore (Tyrone), a branch of the Maguires, descending from Oscar Maguire

- Mac Coscraigh of Cenel Moen, Donegal/Tyrone

- McCoskerans or McCosrichans of Down

- McCoskerans of Ballinderry, Londonderry

Notable people with the surname include:

== In arts and entertainment ==
- Aaron McCusker (born 1978), Northern Irish actor
- Chris McCusker (born 1958), Australian songwriter, musician and sound designer
- David McCusker, developer of the Mork file format
- John McCusker (born 1973), Scottish folk musician, record producer and composer
- Michael McCusker, American film editor
- Paul McCusker (born 1958), American writer and radio producer

== In sport ==
=== Football (soccer) ===
- Damien McCusker (born 1966), Irish Gaelic footballer
- Fergal McCusker (born 1970), Gaelic footballer
- Marc McCusker (born 1989), Scottish footballer
- Niall McCusker (born 1980), Irish Gaelic footballer
- Richie McCusker (born 1970), Scottish footballer

=== Other sports ===
- Carson McCusker (born 1998), American baseball player
- Jim McCusker (1936–2015), American football defensive tackle
- Joan McCusker (born 1965), Canadian Olympic curler
- Red McCusker, Canadian ice hockey goaltender
- Rob McCusker (born 1985), Welsh rugby player
- Riley McCusker (born 2001), American gymnast

== In other fields ==
- Elaine McCusker, American government official
- Emmett McCusker (1889–1973), Canadian politician
- John J. McCusker, American academic in American history and economics
- Harold McCusker (1940–1990), Northern Ireland politician
- Malcolm McCusker (born 1938), Australian philanthropist and barrister, Governor of Western Australia 2011–2014
- Neal McCusker CBE (1907–1987), Commissioner of Railways in New South Wales 1956–1972
- Shawn McCusker (born 1971), American author and educator
