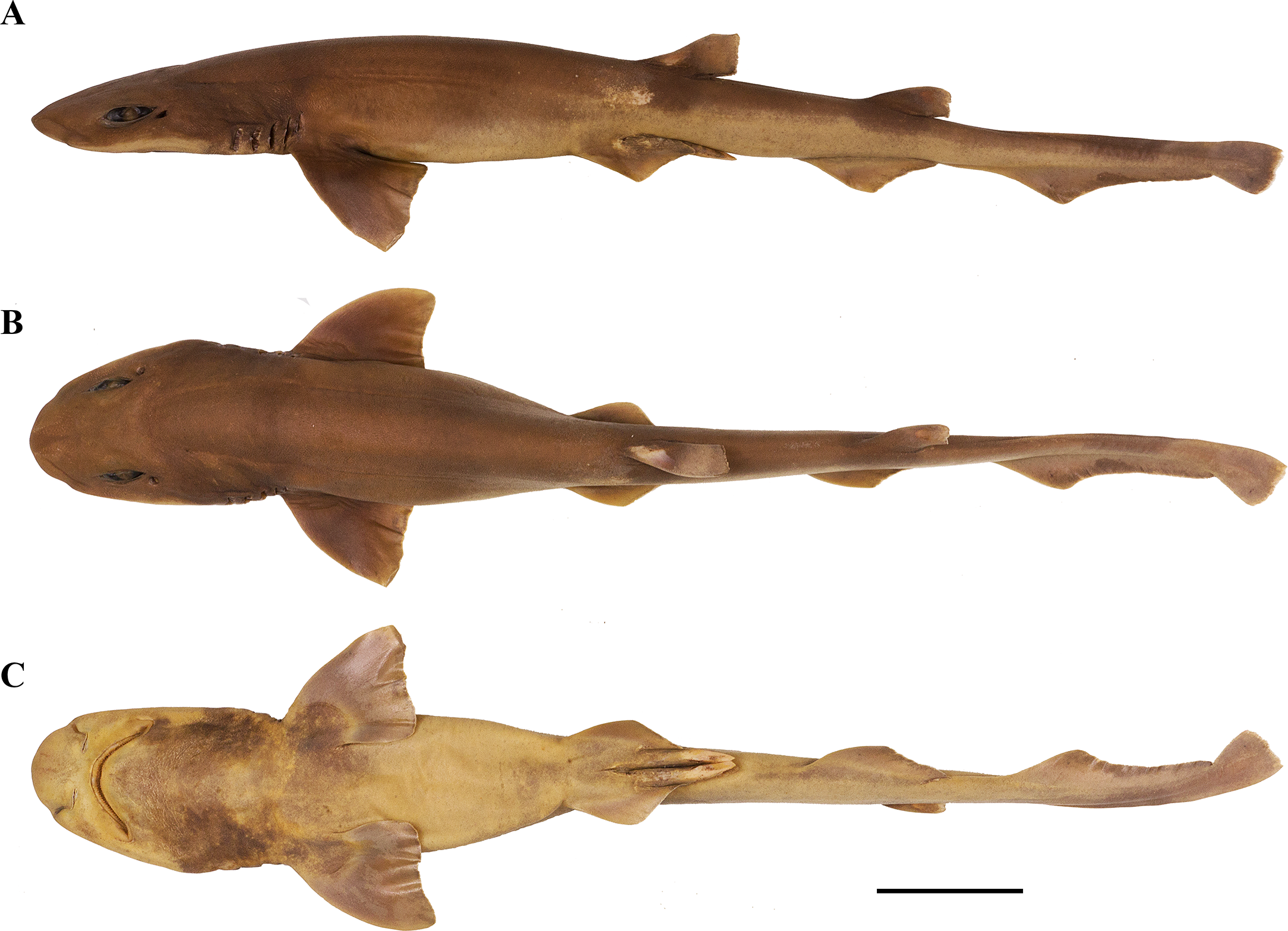

Conservation status
- Data Deficient (IUCN 3.1)

Scientific classification
- Kingdom: Animalia
- Phylum: Chordata
- Class: Chondrichthyes
- Subclass: Elasmobranchii
- Division: Selachii
- Order: Carcharhiniformes
- Family: Pentanchidae
- Genus: Bythaelurus
- Species: B. stewarti

Binomial name
- Bythaelurus stewarti Kaschner, Weigmann & Thiel, 2018

= Bythaelurus stewarti =

Species of shark

Bythaelurus stewarti, the Error Seamount catshark, is a species of shark belonging to the family Pentanchidae, the deepwater catsharks, in the order Carchariniformes. It is endemic to Error Seamount, a guyot located in the Arabian Sea in the western Indian Ocean. Its closest relative is the bristly catshark (B. hispidus), which it differs from in its larger size, darker and more mottled coloration, and especially its smaller and less densely concentrated denticles.
