= Narrowhead =

Narrowhead may refer to:

- Narrowhead catshark
- Narrowhead garter snake

== See also ==
- Narrow Head, American rock band
