= R. africana =

R. africana may refer to:

- Rhinochimaera africana, the paddlenose chimaera or paddlenose spookfish, a fish species
- Richardia africana, a synonym for Zantedeschia aethiopica, the calla lily or arum lily, a plant species

== See also ==
- Africana (disambiguation)
