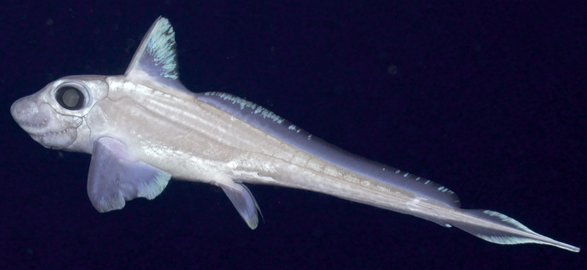

Conservation status
- Least Concern (IUCN 3.1)

Scientific classification
- Kingdom: Animalia
- Phylum: Chordata
- Class: Chondrichthyes
- Subclass: Holocephali
- Order: Chimaeriformes
- Family: Chimaeridae
- Genus: Chimaera
- Species: C. opalescens

Binomial name
- Chimaera opalescens Luchetti, Iglésias & Sellos, 2011

= Opal chimaera =

Species of cartilaginous fish

The opal chimaera (Chimaera opalescens) is a chimaera species in the family Chimaeridae, which lives in the northeastern Atlantic Ocean.

== Description ==
Chimaera opalescens tapers from a large head to a whip-like tail, and has large eyes with a black iris. Its body is iridescent, with juveniles appearing darker with more bronze colouration. Its first dorsal fin is high, with the fin spine not extending beyond the tip of the fin. At maturity, male specimens reach 95cm in total length, and females 92cm, and the species has a maximum total length of 110cm and a maximum precaudal length of 78cm.

== Distribution and habitat ==
The Depth range of Chimaera opalescens is 800–1,975 metres (2,625–6,480 ft) and they prefer a water temperature of approximately 4.3 °C (39.7 °F). They are resident in the waters of Denmark, France, Greenland, Ireland, Morocco, Portugal, Spain, the United Kingdom, and Western Sahara.

With the positive identification of C. opalescens in the waters of the Azores and the similarities between the species and C. monstrosa, and with C. opalescens thought to be occurring in deeper water than C. monstrosa, it has been argued that the species may have been previously misreported as C. monstrosa in the Azores.

== Reproduction ==
C. opalescens is oviparous.

== Conservation ==
Chimaera opalescens is categorised as least concern on the IUCN Red List as of 2020 as despite the fact that they are occasionally a bycatch of deep-water trawl fisheries, their depth range keeps them mostly outside the range of this threat.
