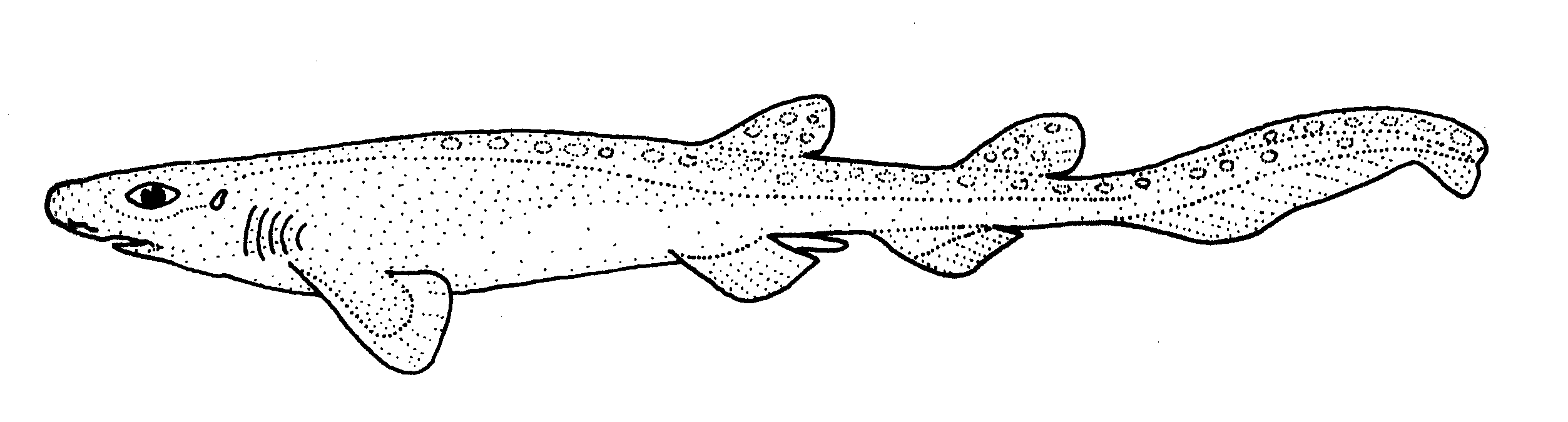

Conservation status
- Least Concern (IUCN 3.1)

Scientific classification
- Kingdom: Animalia
- Phylum: Chordata
- Class: Chondrichthyes
- Subclass: Elasmobranchii
- Division: Selachii
- Order: Carcharhiniformes
- Family: Pentanchidae
- Genus: Bythaelurus
- Species: B. dawsoni

Binomial name
- Bythaelurus dawsoni (S. Springer, 1971)

Synonyms
- Halaelurus dawsoni Springer, 1971

= New Zealand catshark =

Species of shark

The New Zealand catshark (Bythaelurus dawsoni) is a species of shark belonging to the family Pentanchidae, the deepwater catsharks, in the order Carcharhiniformes. This species is endemic to in the deep waters around New Zealand. Its length is up to 45 centimetres (18 in). The New Zealand catshark is a small, little-known deep water bottom shark. It is dark brown around the top with a few widely spaced pale spots, and white below. It feeds on bottom-living crustaceans. It is also completely harmless to humans.

== Conservation status ==
The New Zealand Department of Conservation has classified the New Zealand catshark as "Not Threatened" but with the qualifier "Data Poor" under the New Zealand Threat Classification System. It is regarded as being at risk from bottom trawling.
