= McCosker =

McCosker is a surname. Notable people with the surname include:

- John E. McCosker, American ichthyologist
- John McCosker (rower) (1910–1965), American rower
- Kim McCosker, Australian writer
- Rick McCosker (born 1946), Australian cricketer

== See also ==
- Thomas McCosker v The State, Fiji lawsuit
- Tim McOsker (born 1962), American politician
- McCusker, surname
