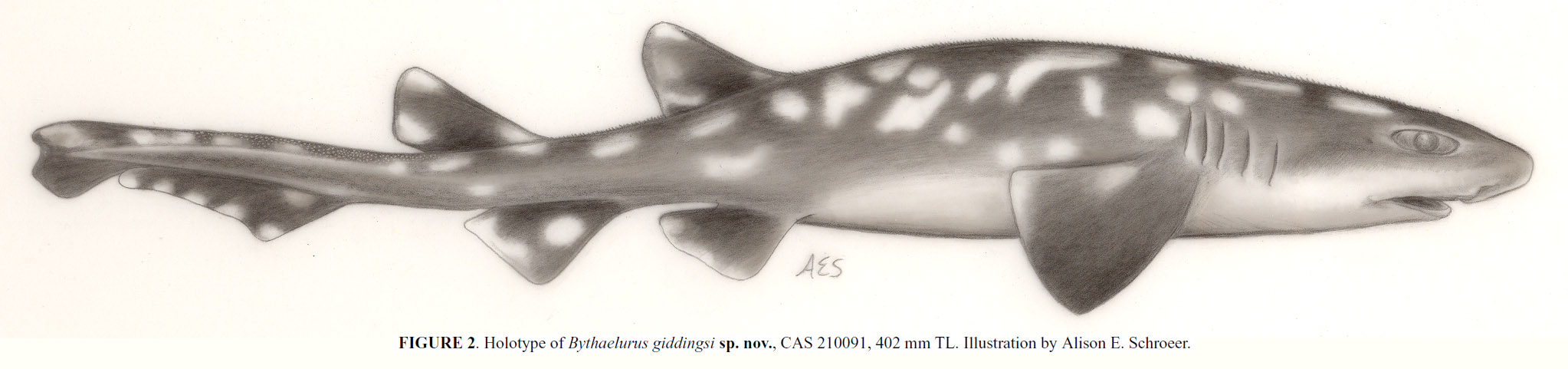

Conservation status
- Least Concern (IUCN 3.1)

Scientific classification
- Kingdom: Animalia
- Phylum: Chordata
- Class: Chondrichthyes
- Subclass: Elasmobranchii
- Division: Selachii
- Order: Carcharhiniformes
- Family: Pentanchidae
- Genus: Bythaelurus
- Species: B. giddingsi

Binomial name
- Bythaelurus giddingsi McCosker, Long & Baldwin, 2012

= Jaguar catshark =

Species of shark

The jaguar catshark (Bythaelurus giddingsi), also known as the Galápagos catshark, is a species of shark belonging to the family Pentanchidae, the deepwater catsharks, endemic to the Galápagos Islands. The species was first described in 2012. This catshark is about 30 cm (12 in) long when mature, and it is colored blackish-brown with an asymmetrical pattern of light spots.

== Taxonomy ==
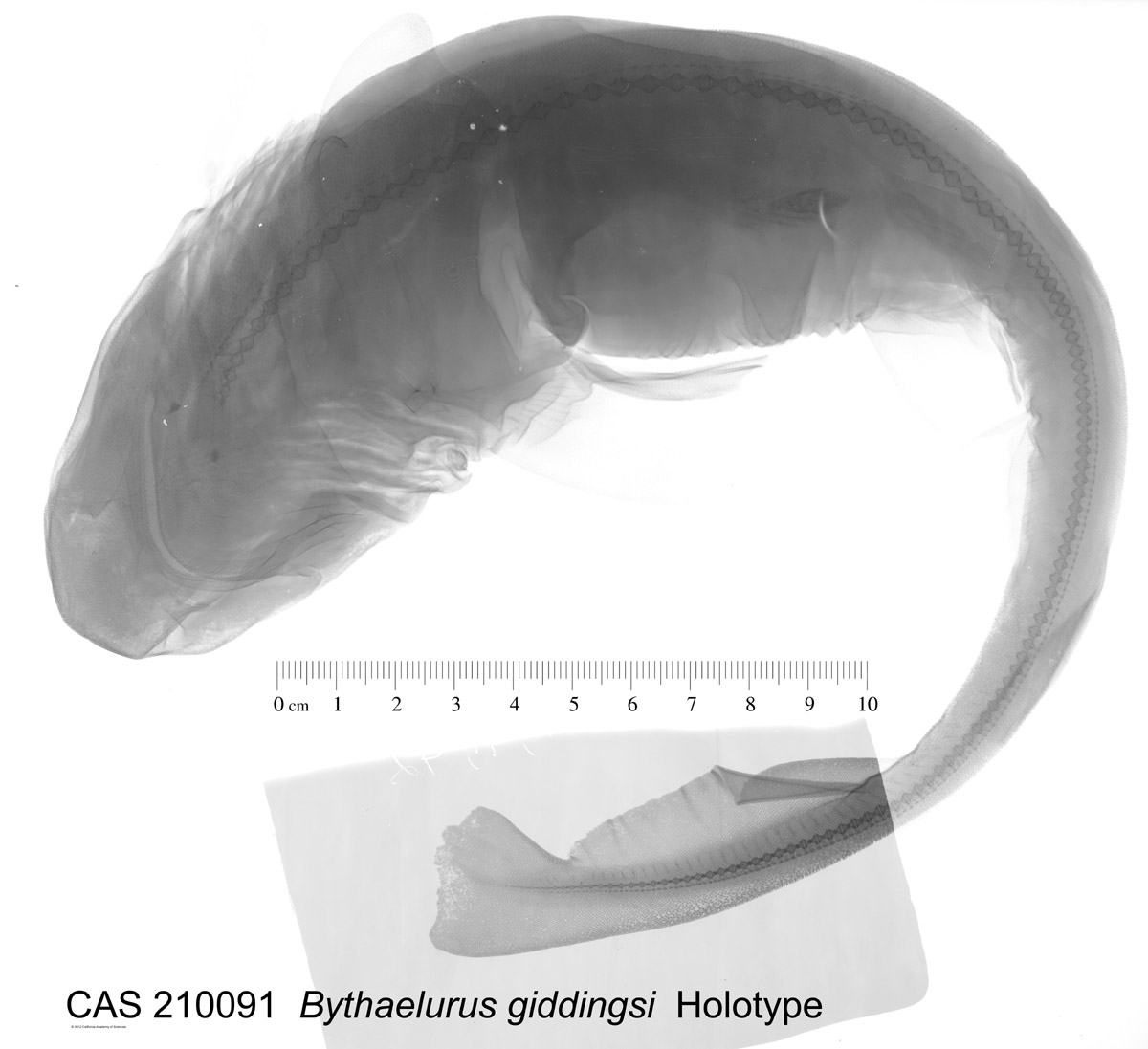
The holotype specimen collected in the Galápagos Islands.

The species was first discovered in 1995 on an expedition to the Galápagos Islands led by John McCosker from the California Academy of Sciences. The purpose of the expedition was to film a documentary about the Galápagos Islands for the Discovery Channel, which aired in 1996. Douglas Long was the first to notice the new shark species while he was processing the fish samples that were collected during the expedition. Though not yet formally described, the name Galápagos catshark was used in non-scientific shark literature for several years prior to the published description. The species was formally described as a new species in an article by McCosker, Long and Carole Baldwin which was published in Zootaxa in March 2012. As the authors did not propose a common name in their original publication, and also because there are several species of catshark from the Galápagos Islands, the name jaguar catshark was subsequently proposed, and later used in print. The scientific name honors underwater photographer and cinematographer Al Giddings, and the common name is in reference to the spotted pattern characteristic of the species, as well as its resemblance to the mythical jaguar shark in the Wes Anderson movie The Life Aquatic with Steve Zissou.

== Description ==
The jaguar catshark is blackish-brown on top with light spots arranged in an asymmetric pattern. Other species of catshark either lack spots, or else have a spots arranged in a single line. The bottom of the shark is lighter.

It is about a 30 cm (12 in) in length, and thus an intermediate sized catshark. Its head is short, representing between 21% and 24% of the shark's total length. The front of its snout is blunt and round. It has two high, narrow dorsal fins and a low, broad anal fin. The pectoral and pelvic fins have a somewhat triangular shape. It has a narrow, asymmetrical caudal fin.

== Distribution and habitat ==
The jaguar catshark is known only from waters around several of the Galápagos Islands, including San Cristóbal Island, Darwin Island, Marchena Island and Fernandina Island. According to John McCosker, "since this catshark's range is restricted to the Galápagos, its population is likely limited in size, making it more susceptible than more widely distributed species." It has been found at depths ranging from 428 to 562 m (1,404 to 1,844 ft). It lives over relatively flat areas with either sandy or a mixture of sandy and muddy substrates.

== Feeding ==
Like other catsharks, the jaguar catshark lives near the sea floor and presumably eats fish and small invertebrates.
