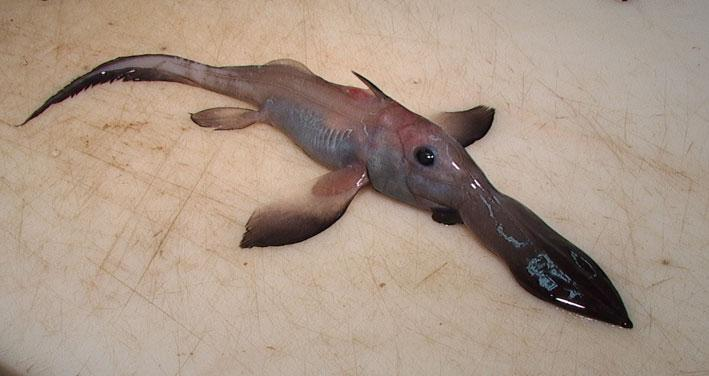
- Rhinochimaera pacifica

Scientific classification
- Kingdom: Animalia
- Phylum: Chordata
- Class: Chondrichthyes
- Subclass: Holocephali
- Order: Chimaeriformes
- Family: Rhinochimaeridae
- Genus: Rhinochimaera; Garman, 1901

= Rhinochimaera =

Genus of cartilaginous fishes

Rhinochimaera is a genus of cartilaginous fish in the family Rhinochimaeridae, with these species:

- Rhinochimaera africana Compagno, Stehmann & Ebert, 1990 (paddlenose chimaera)
- Rhinochimaera atlantica Holt & Byrne, 1909 (broadnose chimaera)
- Rhinochimaera costaricana Vidaurre-Quesada, Salas-Jimenez, Carvajal-Rodriguez, Lara-Quesada, Santos, Araripe & Angulo, 2026 (Eastern Pacific Paddlenose Chimaera)
- Rhinochimaera pacifica Mitsukuri, 1895 (Pacific spookfish)
