= Centrophorus lesliei =

Scientific classification
- Kingdom: Animalia
- Phylum: Chordata
- Class: Chondrichthyes
- Subclass: Elasmobranchii
- Division: Selachii
- Order: Squaliformes
- Family: Centrophoridae
- Genus: Centrophorus
- Species: C. lesliei

Binomial name
- Centrophorus lesliei White, Ebert & Naylor, 2017

Species of shark

Centrophorus lesliei, the African gulper shark, is a species of gulper shark found in the Western Indian Ocean, Mozambique Channel, and in the Atlantic Ocean off the coasts of Côte d'Ivoire, Equatorial Guinea, the Canary Islands, Ghana, Togo, and Senegal.
