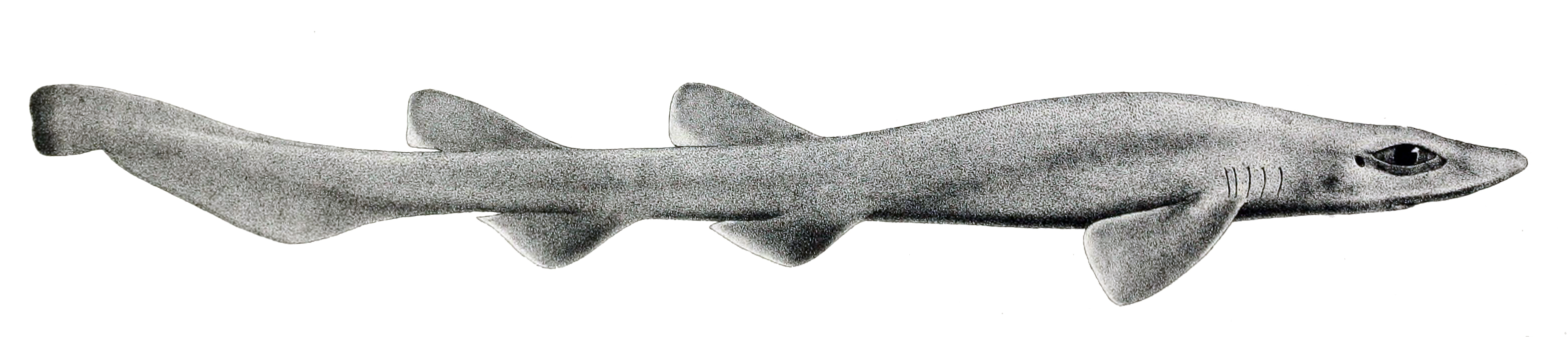

Conservation status
- Vulnerable (IUCN 3.1)

Scientific classification
- Kingdom: Animalia
- Phylum: Chordata
- Class: Chondrichthyes
- Subclass: Elasmobranchii
- Division: Selachii
- Order: Carcharhiniformes
- Family: Pentanchidae
- Genus: Bythaelurus
- Species: B. canescens

Binomial name
- Bythaelurus canescens (Günther, 1878)

Synonyms
- Halaelurus canescens Günther, 1878

= Dusky catshark =

Species of shark

The dusky catshark (Bythaelurus canescens) is a species of shark belonging to the family Pentanchidae, the deepwater catsharks. This shark is endemic to the southeast Pacific Ocean, off the coasts of Peru and Chile. It grows to a maximum length of 70 cm (28 in), and is oviparous like many other chondrichthyans in the Indo-Pacific.

== Ecology ==
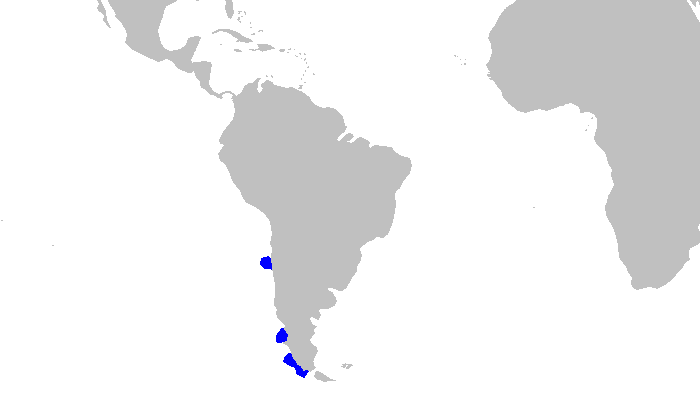
Regions with common Bythaelurus canescens sightings.

Bythaelurus canescens is deep-sea shark, generally located between depths of 250–1,260 m (820–4,130 ft). It lives primarily on mud on the upper continental slopes, but can also be found on rocky bottoms. It is an important mesopredator, and is often caught it shrimp trawl nets in northern and central Chilean coasts. Sometimes B. canescens makes up to 20.3% of the total catch. In spite of this, little is known about it because it is often thrown back without further consideration. Trophic ecology studies are often done on B. canescens to obtain a general overview of their diet.

== Diet Studies ==
Much of what is known about the ecology and predicted behavior of the dusky catshark is known due to studies of stomach samples. Their most important prey were reported to be the squid Loligo gahi, the siphonophore Sulculeolaria quadrivalvis, and the bony fishes Muggiea atlantica and Coelorhynchus fasciatus. Overall, the bulk mass consumed consisted of siphonophores. Other prey options such as octopus or crustaceans would depend on environmental availability, making the dusky catshark a general bentho-demersal predator that eats what fits in its mouth. Its diet is similar to those of other Scyliorhinidae sharks in the Chilean deep sea which are opportunistic hunters. It is also possible it undergoes vertical migration while following its food source.

In a separate study, the deep-sea shrimp Heterocarpus reedi is reported to be the main food source for B. canescens, which is to be expected as dusky catsharks are often caught in the H. reedi nets. Its diet was again found to consist mostly of benthic prey sources. However, there is still some data lacking as most Bythaelurus canescens specimens caught are juveniles; adults tend to live at deeper depths of around 1000 meters.

At an active methane seep off the coast of Chile, Bythaelurus canescens was reported to be one of the top predators, with a highly variable diet.

== Reproduction ==
Like many sharks, Bythaelurus canescens reproduces using complex egg capsules which are deposited on the sea floor or attached to rocks and corals. Scyliorhinid shark eggs are vase-shaped, and are carried two at a time, one in each uterus. The capsules are light yellow-brown, and darken to brown after fixation to the sea floor. The capsule is slightly translucent, elongated and flattened, and ridged lengthwise, with a long tendril extending from each corner. Fixation occurs by two of the four tendrils, with two strong, coiled posterior tendrils designed to hold onto substrate. Development occurs after the egg has been laid, with no aid from the parents.
