= Bythaelurus bachi =

Conservation status
- Data Deficient (IUCN 3.1)

Scientific classification
- Kingdom: Animalia
- Phylum: Chordata
- Class: Chondrichthyes
- Subclass: Elasmobranchii
- Division: Selachii
- Order: Carcharhiniformes
- Family: Pentanchidae
- Genus: Bythaelurus
- Species: B. bachi

Binomial name
- Bythaelurus bachi Weigmann, Ebert, Clerkin, Stehmann & Naylor, 2016
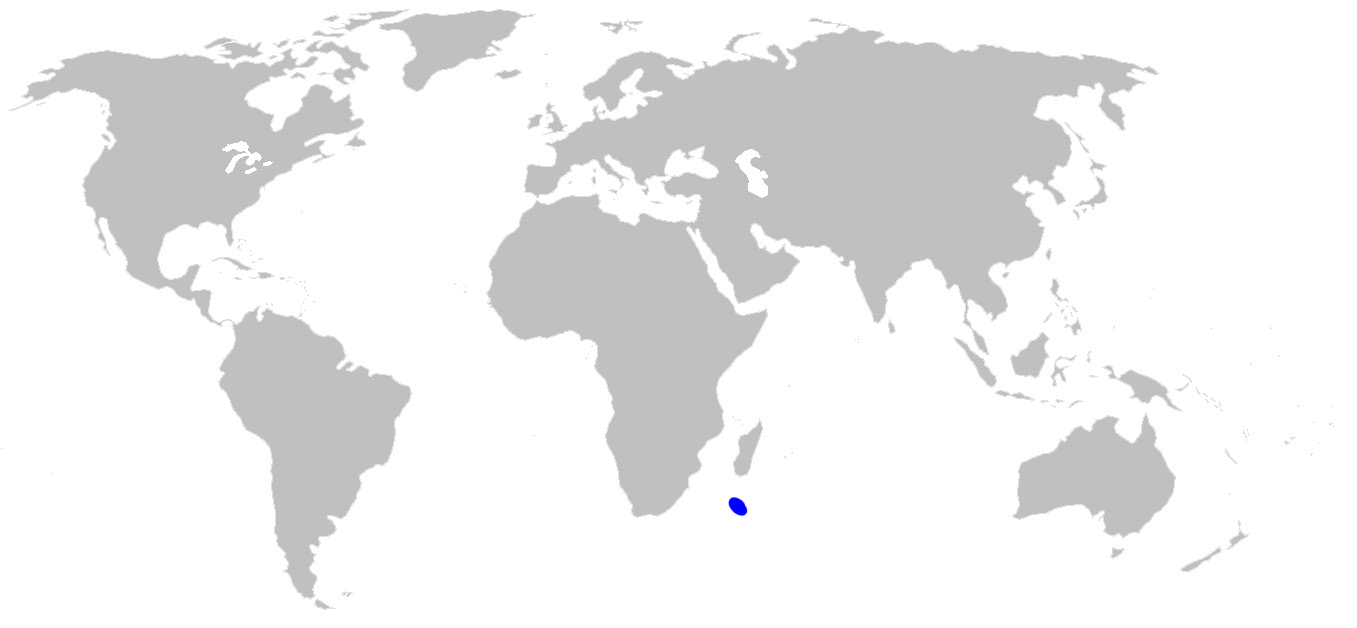
- Range of Bach's catshark

Catshark species

Bythaelurus bachi, commonly known as Bach's catshark, is a species of shark belonging to the family Pentanchidae, the deepwater catsharks. This shark is found on the southern Madagascar Ridge in the southwestern Indian Ocean. This stout-bodied catshark is thought to inhabit the deep sea at depths of 910–1,365 m (2,986–4,478 ft).

Compared to all of its congeners in Western Indian Ocean, Bach's catshark has higher diversity of dermal denticle morphology in general, lighter body coloration, and the presence of numerous partially composite papillae on its tongue and palate (the roof of a mouth).
