= Sombre catshark =

Conservation status
- Data Deficient (IUCN 3.1)

Scientific classification
- Kingdom: Animalia
- Phylum: Chordata
- Class: Chondrichthyes
- Subclass: Elasmobranchii
- Division: Selachii
- Order: Carcharhiniformes
- Family: Pentanchidae
- Genus: Bythaelurus
- Species: B. incanus

Binomial name
- Bythaelurus incanus Last & Stevens, 2008

Species of shark

The sombre catshark (Bythaelurus incanus) is a species of shark belonging to the family Pentanchidae, the deepwater catsharks. It is known from a single specimen south of Rote Island, northwestern Australia. Its natural habitat is the open seas. It is unknown how they reproduce or how big their litters are.
