= Amylodon =

Amylodon Temporal range: Campanian– Rupelian

Scientific classification
- Kingdom: Animalia
- Phylum: Chordata
- Class: Chondrichthyes
- Order: Chimaeriformes
- Genus: Amylodon Storms, 1895

Species
- Amylodon eocenica; Amylodon delheidi; Amylodon venablesae; Amylodon karamysh

Extinct Chimaera genus

Amylodon is an extinct genus of chimaera. It consists of four described species. A. karamysh is known from the latest early Campanian of Russia, the name being derived from the Karamysh River which runs near the type locality. In the Eocene, two species are known. A. venablesae and A. eocenica are both known from the Ypresian-aged London Clay of England. A mandibular plate originally ascribed to the latter was found in the Bartonian of the Barton Beds of England, though later found not to fit with any described species. A. delheidi is known from the Rupelian-aged Boom Clay of Belgium. All species are known mainly from isolated mandibles. They show a slow progressing towards increased shearing ability. Amylodon was considered to be a member of Chimaeridae in Nessov and Averianov, 1996 but other studies have either been assigned to the "Edaphodontidae", or to the Rhinochimaeridae.
