= Bythaelurus vivaldii =

Conservation status
- Data Deficient (IUCN 3.1)

Scientific classification
- Kingdom: Animalia
- Phylum: Chordata
- Class: Chondrichthyes
- Subclass: Elasmobranchii
- Division: Selachii
- Order: Carcharhiniformes
- Family: Pentanchidae
- Genus: Bythaelurus
- Species: B. vivaldii

Binomial name
- Bythaelurus vivaldii Weigmann & Kaschner, 2017
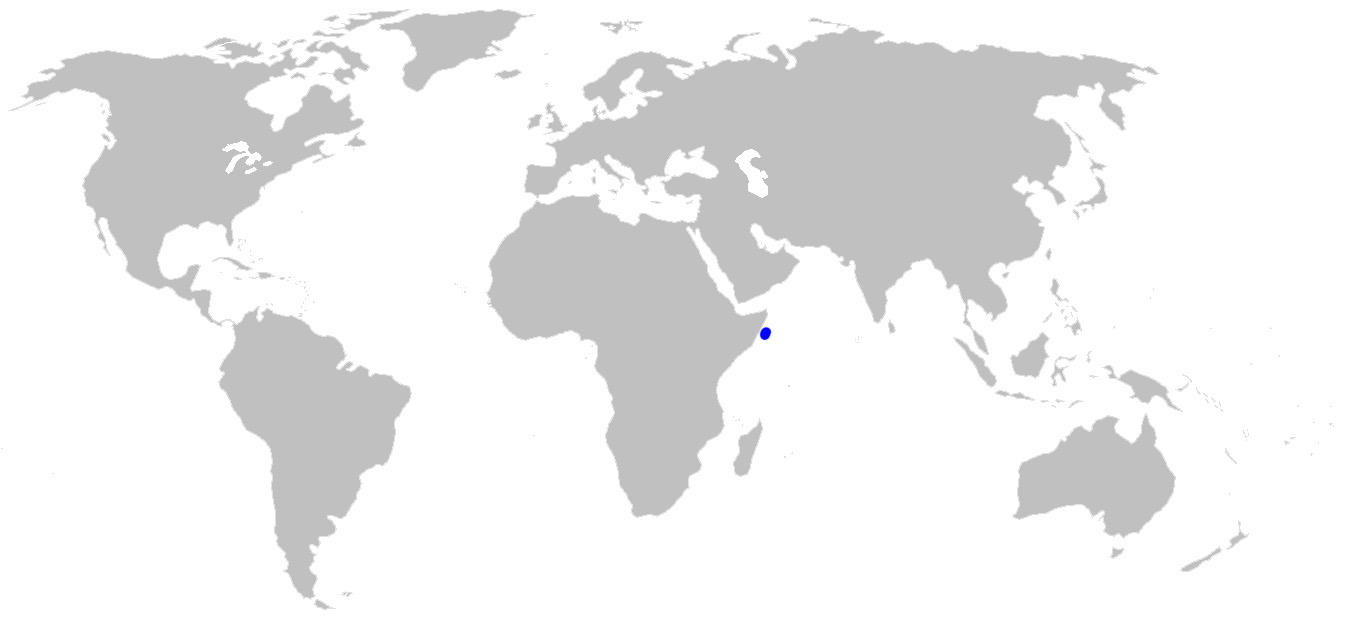
- Range of Vivaldi's catshark

Catshark species

Bythaelurus vivaldii, Vivaldi's catshark, is a species of shark belonging to the family Pentanchidae, the deepwater catsharks. This catshark is found in Northwestern Indian Ocean, specifically in Somalia. It presumably lives in the depths of up to 628 m (2,060 ft).

This small deep-water catshark has a long and broad head, a stout body, a shorter caudal fin, a larger interdorsal space, and a larger intergill length compared to all congeners living in Western Indian Ocean.
