= Cape chimaera =

Conservation status
- Least Concern (IUCN 3.1)

Scientific classification
- Kingdom: Animalia
- Phylum: Chordata
- Class: Chondrichthyes
- Subclass: Holocephali
- Order: Chimaeriformes
- Family: Chimaeridae
- Genus: Chimaera
- Species: C. notafricana

Binomial name
- Chimaera notafricana Kemper, Ebert, Compagno & Didier, 2010

Species of cartilaginous fish

The cape chimaera (Chimaera notafricana) is a chimaera species in the family Chimaeridae, which lives in South Africa and Namibia.

== Taxonomy ==
The cape chimaera is one of 16 species in the genus Chimaera. The species was described in 2010 by Kemper, Ebert Compagno and Didier. Prior to 2010, specimens were classified under the species Chimaera monstrosa, commonly known as the rabbit fish, before further studies showed that they had a number of differences in distribution and appearance, enough to classify them as two separate species.

== Habitat and distribution ==
The cape chimaera is found in the southeast Atlantic Ocean, in the waters off Namibia as well as South Africa, particularly in the Western Cape, Northern Cape Province, and Eastern Cape Province. Its exact population being unknown, but it is thought to be an uncommon species. Although the species is occasionally caught as a bycatch by deepwater fisheries, it is not threatened and is not sought out for commercial purposes. Currently, there are no conservation measures taking place on behalf of the species and as of November 18, 2010 it is listed as Least Concern by IUCN.

The cape chimaera lives in waters 680 metres (2,230 ft) – 1,000 metres (3,300 ft) deep. It is believed to be a benthic species, living at the sea floor of the continental slope. Little else is known about its habitat of the species.
