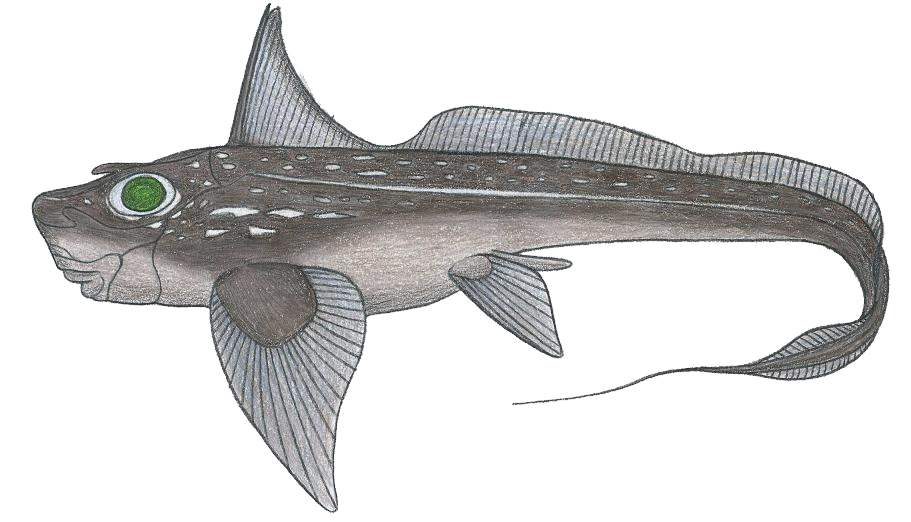

Conservation status
- Vulnerable (IUCN 3.1)

Scientific classification
- Kingdom: Animalia
- Phylum: Chordata
- Class: Chondrichthyes
- Subclass: Holocephali
- Order: Chimaeriformes
- Family: Chimaeridae
- Genus: Hydrolagus
- Species: H. matallanasi

Binomial name
- Hydrolagus matallanasi Soto & Vooren, 2004

= Hydrolagus matallanasi =

Species of cartilaginous fish

Hydrolagus matallanasi, the striped rabbitfish, is a species of very rare, deep-water chimaera that lives in the ocean at depths to 600 m. It was discovered in 2001 by a team of Brazilian scientists.

These 40-cm-long fishes have an unusual appearance; they have wing-like pectoral fins, a pointed dorsal fin, and a long, whip-like tail. The fish can see in practically total darkness and sense electromagnetic radiation (outside of the visible spectrum) emitted by other marine creatures due to exposed nerves on the sides of its body.

The fish is named after Spanish scientist Jesus Matallanas.
