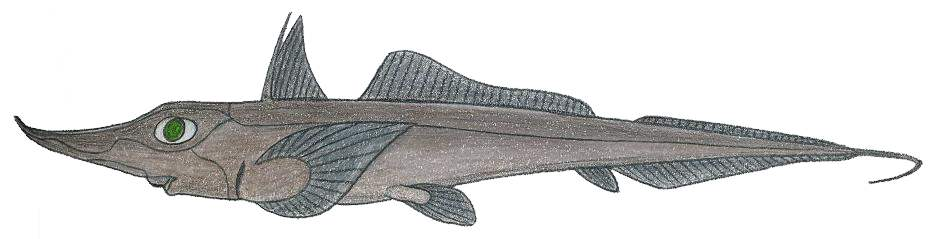

Conservation status
- Near Threatened (IUCN 3.1)

Scientific classification
- Kingdom: Animalia
- Phylum: Chordata
- Class: Chondrichthyes
- Subclass: Holocephali
- Order: Chimaeriformes
- Family: Rhinochimaeridae
- Genus: Neoharriotta
- Species: N. carri

Binomial name
- Neoharriotta carri Bullis & J. S. Carpenter, 1966

= Dwarf sicklefin chimaera =

Species of fish

The dwarf sicklefin chimaera (Neoharriotta carri) is a species of fish in the family Rhinochimaeridae found in Colombia and Venezuela. Its natural habitat is open seas. It is threatened by habitat loss.
