= Bristly catshark =

Conservation status
- Near Threatened (IUCN 3.1)

Scientific classification
- Kingdom: Animalia
- Phylum: Chordata
- Class: Chondrichthyes
- Subclass: Elasmobranchii
- Division: Selachii
- Order: Carcharhiniformes
- Family: Pentanchidae
- Genus: Bythaelurus
- Species: B. hispidus

Binomial name
- Bythaelurus hispidus (Alcock, 1891)
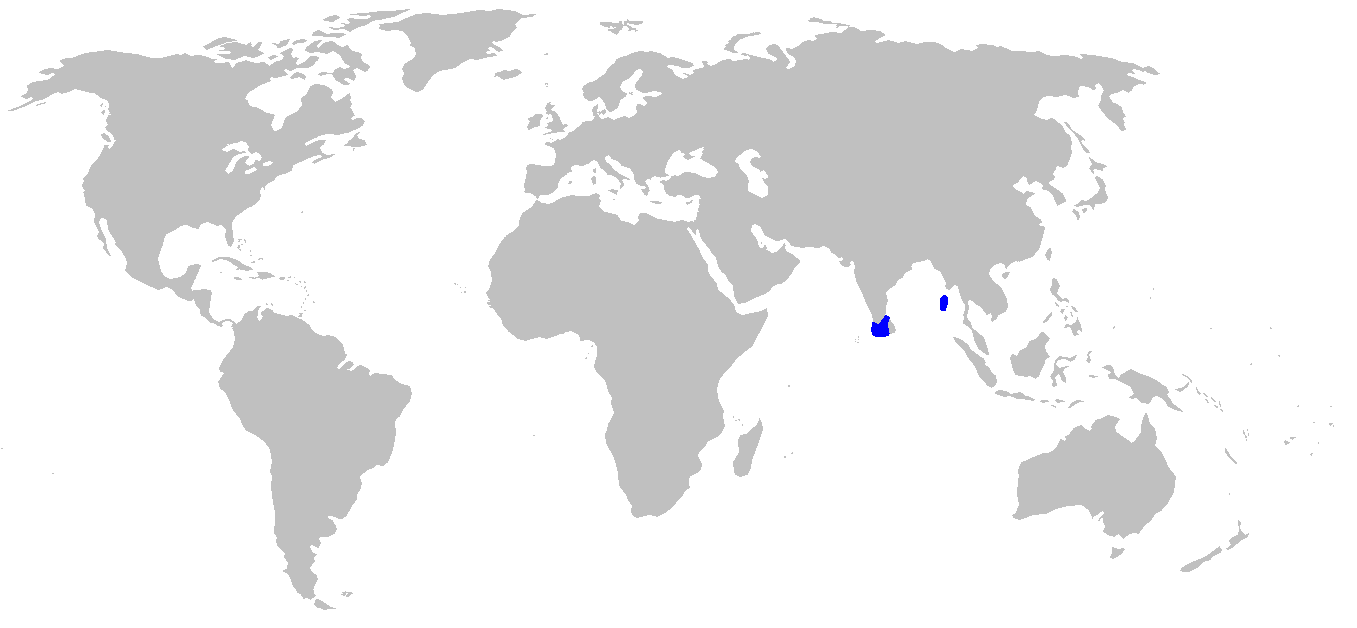

Synonyms
- Halaelurus hispidus Alcock, 1891

Species of shark

The bristly catshark (Bythaelurus hispidus) is a species of shark belonging to the family Pentanchidae, the deepwater catsharks. This shark is found from southeastern India and the Andaman Islands, between latitudes 15° N and 5° N, at depths between 200 and 300 m. Its length usually ranges from around 20–26 cm (7.9–10.2 in), and it is regarded as the smallest catshark of Bythaelurus.

== Taxonomy ==
Bristly catsharks were first discovered by Alfred William Alcock in the Indian Ocean in 1891. The specific word, hispidus, is thought to represent the papillae that generally appeared in species live in Andaman Sea. However, it was not named as alcockii. Instead, the species named Halaelurus alcockii, also known as Bythaelurus alcockii, is another kind of catshark commonly known as Arabian catshark discovered by a German in 1913.

== Appearance and habitat ==
The bristly catshark is a small species among the shark family, and as the name suggests, it has lengthened, cat-like eyes on the side that help it to be easily distinguished. The long abdomen, rounded snout with a parabolic knoblike tip, and short wrinkle labial also differentiate it from other catsharks. Instead of having patterned appearance like most other catsharks do, the bristly catshark has no dark spots nor colored stripes. There are three more species of Halaelurus which share this characteristic: canescens, dawsoni, and lutarius, while the bristly catshark is usually in a pale brown or white color. Among these three species, bristly catsharks relate the H. lutarius the most. They share many similarities, except that bristly catsharks are a little smaller with larger eyes. Also, bristly catsharks were found to have papillae on the tongue, while the H. lutarius lack the presence of papillae. The bristly catsharks live in the deep sea and are restricted to India, Sri Lanka, Thailand, and the Andaman Islands on the outer continental shelf and upper continental slope at 250–1262 m.

== Reproduction ==
The diameter of the eggs ranges from 2-4 mm in females with functional but immature ovaries; 15–21 mm in females with well-developed ovaries.

== Feeding ==
Young bristly catsharks prey on crustaceans more often, such as deep-sea mud shrimp, than other fishes, but further observation is needed to better understand the forage structure of bristly catsharks.
