= Arabian sicklefin chimaera =

Conservation status
- Least Concern (IUCN 3.1)

Scientific classification
- Kingdom: Animalia
- Phylum: Chordata
- Class: Chondrichthyes
- Subclass: Holocephali
- Order: Chimaeriformes
- Family: Rhinochimaeridae
- Genus: Neoharriotta
- Species: N. pumila

Binomial name
- Neoharriotta pumila Didier & Stehmann, 1996

Species of fish

The Arabian sicklefin chimaera (Neoharriotta pumila) is a species of fish in the family Rhinochimaeridae found near Somalia, Yemen, and possibly India. Its natural habitat is open seas.
