= Southern chimaera =

Southern chimera

Conservation status
- Least Concern (IUCN 3.1)

Scientific classification
- Kingdom: Animalia
- Phylum: Chordata
- Class: Chondrichthyes
- Subclass: Holocephali
- Order: Chimaeriformes
- Family: Chimaeridae
- Genus: Chimaera
- Species: C. fulva

Binomial name
- Chimaera fulva Didier, Last & White, 2008

Species of cartilaginous fish

The southern chimaera (Chimaera fulva) is a chimaera species in the family Chimaeridae. It lives in Australia, usually in marine waters 780 to 1095 meters deep. It can grow to a maximum length of at least 100 centimeters, and is sometimes confused with Chimaera obscura, a similar species in its genus.

== Description ==
Male specimens of the southern chimaera can grow up to a maximum total length of 100 centimeters, and females can grow to 118.7 centimeters. Its coloring ranges from a silver pink to a pale brown. Its dorsal spine is short, and males have large claspers, which contain bristles at the end. The species is sometimes confused with Chimaera obscura, a related species commonly known as the shortspine chimaera. However, the species are different morphological; notably, C. fulva is lighter in color than C. obscura.

== Behavior and habitat ==
The southern chimaera is a bathydemersal marine species, typically living in waters 780 to 1095 meters deep, though it has been found in shallower waters as well. The species is oviparous.

== Distribution and conservation ==
The southern chimaera is distributed in areas off the coast of Australia, from the New South Wales in the east to Western Australia. It lives in the southwest Pacific Ocean and the eastern Indian Ocean. It is a relatively uncommon species, but its population is currently stable. The exact population of the species is unknown.

The species is a common bycatch by fisheries in southern Australia. It is estimated that the Southern and Eastern Scalefish and Shark Fishery catches roughly 12 tonnes of the species a year as a bycatch. Despite these issues, there are currently no conservation actions taking place for the species. IUCN lists it as being of Least Concern.
