= Ninespot chimaera =

Conservation status
- Data Deficient (IUCN 3.1)

Scientific classification
- Kingdom: Animalia
- Phylum: Chordata
- Class: Chondrichthyes
- Subclass: Holocephali
- Order: Chimaeriformes
- Family: Chimaeridae
- Genus: Hydrolagus
- Species: H. barbouri

Binomial name
- Hydrolagus barbouri (Garman, 1908)

Synonyms
- Chimaera barbouri Garman, 1908; Chimaera spilota Tanaka, 1908

Species of cartilaginous fish

The ninespot chimaera (Hydrolagus barbouri) is a species of chimaera endemic to the waters off Japan and the South China Sea in the Northwest Pacific. Its natural habitat is open seas and its depth range is 100–1,100 metres (330–3,610 ft). It can reach a maximum total length of 60.0 centimetres (23.6 in). Carnivorous in nature and with oviparous reproduction, its eggs are encased in horny shells.
