= Chimaera willwatchi =

Scientific classification
- Kingdom: Animalia
- Phylum: Chordata
- Class: Chondrichthyes
- Subclass: Holocephali
- Order: Chimaeriformes
- Family: Chimaeridae
- Genus: Chimaera
- Species: C. willwatchi

Binomial name
- Chimaera willwatchi Clerkin, Ebert & Kemper, 2017

Species of fish

Chimaera willwatchi is a bathydemersal chimaera found in southwest Indian Ocean Ridge, northern Madagascar Rift, and Walter Shoals.

== Description ==
Chimaera willwatchi has several general characteristics, such as blocky head, square snout, large body, well-defined suborbital ridges, slight iridescent sheen, and brown purple-colored body. The maximum total length of this species is around 83.4 cm for the male specimens and 97.1 cm for female specimens.

== Habitat & distribution ==
This chimaera possibly inhabits the depths of 89 - 1365 m.
