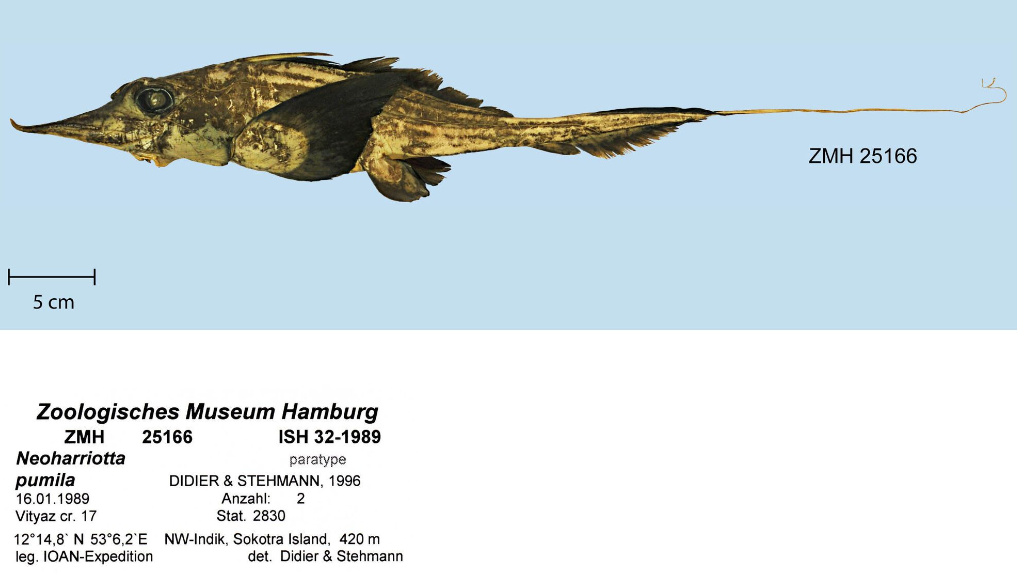
- Neoharriotta pumila

Scientific classification
- Kingdom: Animalia
- Phylum: Chordata
- Class: Chondrichthyes
- Subclass: Holocephali
- Order: Chimaeriformes
- Family: Rhinochimaeridae
- Genus: Neoharriotta; Bigelow & Schroeder, 1950

= Neoharriotta =

Genus of cartilaginous fishes

Neoharriotta is a genus of fish in the family Rhinochimaeridae.

== Species ==
- Neoharriotta carri Bullis & J. S. Carpenter, 1966 (Dwarf sicklefin chimaera)
- Neoharriotta pinnata Schnakenbeck, 1931 (Sicklefin chimaera)
- Neoharriotta pumila Didier & Stehmann, 1996 (Arabian sicklefin chimaera)
