= Richie McCusker =

Scottish footballer

Personal information
- Full name: Richard McCusker
- Date of birth: 24 August 1970 (age 56)
- Place of birth: Glasgow, Scotland
- Position: Midfielder

Senior career*
Years	Team	Apps	(Gls)
1998–2001	Clyde	76	(13)
- * Club domestic league appearances and goals

Richard McCusker (born 24 August 1970) is a Scottish former professional footballer.

== Career ==
In the summer of 1998, McCusker was part of the Junior revolution which swept through Clyde, being one of eleven players coming from the junior ranks to join the Bully Wee. He had previously played for Maryhill.

McCusker became a fans favourite at Clyde, and played a key role in helping the team win the Scottish Second Division championship in 2000. Injury meant McCusker lost his place in the team midway through the 2000–01 season, and he never really regained his place in the side. He left in November 2001, to return to former club Maryhill.

== Personal life ==
McCusker was the victim of a stroke in December 2007. and again in September 2008.

A Maryhill vs Pollok Legends benefit match for him took place in March 2009. The 'Game of Support' starred many former teammates.

== Honours ==
Maryhill

- Central Premier Division: 1996–97, 1997–98
- Central Division C: 1993–94
- West of Scotland Cup: 2000–01, 2003–04
- Central League Cup: 1995–96
- ET Cup Winners' Cup; 1995–96, 1996–97, 1997–98

Clyde

- Scottish Second Division: 1999–2000
