= Shortspine chimaera =

Conservation status
- Least Concern (IUCN 3.1)

Scientific classification
- Kingdom: Animalia
- Phylum: Chordata
- Class: Chondrichthyes
- Subclass: Holocephali
- Order: Chimaeriformes
- Family: Chimaeridae
- Genus: Chimaera
- Species: C. obscura

Binomial name
- Chimaera obscura Didier, Last & White, 2008

Species of cartilaginous fish

The shortspine chimaera (Chimaera obscura), also commonly known as the short spine chimaera, is a chimaera species in the family Chimaeridae, which lives off of the east coast of Australia.

== Description ==
The shortspine chimaera is similar to the other species in its genus, but of uniformly dark brown to black colour. It has a robust body, and has a shorter spine than first dorsal fin. Although it has a similar range and appearance to the southern chimaera, the shortspine chimaera is darker in colour and smaller. A maximum size of at least 95 cm total length (including tail) and 53 cm body length (excluding tail) in females has been reported.

== Distribution and habitat ==
The shortspine chimaera is a subtropical species, inhabiting the upper to mid continental slope on the east coast of Australia, at depths of around 450–1,080 m, although it most commonly lives in waters deeper than 1,025 m. In particular, the species is found near Tuncurry, New South Wales; sightings have been reported in other spots on the east coast, from Ulladulla to Queensland, but it is probable that these are actually a different species. It is not targeted commercially, and most fisheries trawl in waters shallower than where the species typically lives, so no conservation actions are currently taking place for the species; however, it may be a bycatch for deepwater fisheries. The exact population of the species is unknown, but is listed as least concern by the International Union for Conservation of Nature.
