= Arabian catshark =

Conservation status
- Data Deficient (IUCN 3.1)

Scientific classification
- Kingdom: Animalia
- Phylum: Chordata
- Class: Chondrichthyes
- Subclass: Elasmobranchii
- Division: Selachii
- Order: Carcharhiniformes
- Family: Pentanchidae
- Genus: Bythaelurus
- Species: B. alcockii

Binomial name
- Bythaelurus alcockii (Garman, 1913)

Synonyms
- Halaelurus alcockii Garman, 1913

Species of shark

The Arabian catshark (Bythaelurus alcockii) is a species of shark belonging to the family Pentanchidae, the deepwater catsharks. It can grow up to 30 centimetres (12 in) long, and lives in open seas. It is only known from a single specimen, now lost, which was found on the continental slope of the Arabian Sea.
