= Red McCusker =

Canadian ice hockey player

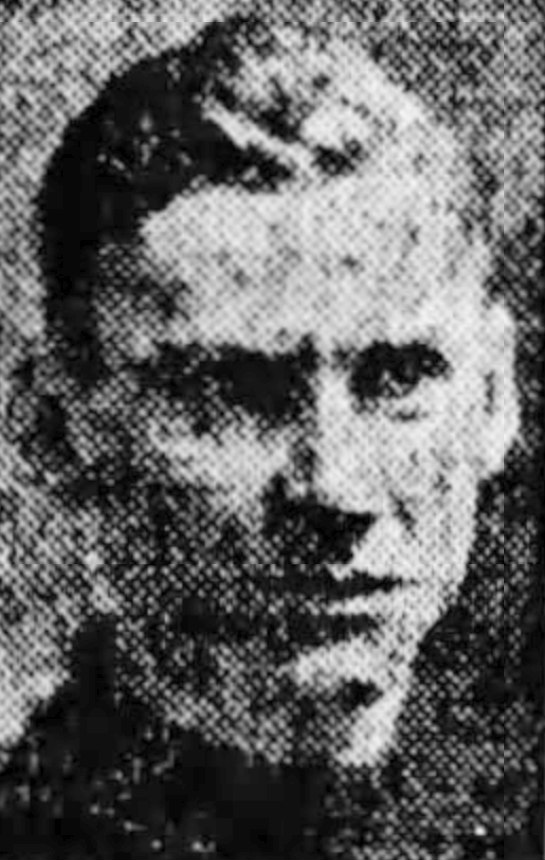
- McCusker circa 1922
- Born: June 28, 1895; Regina, Saskatchewan, Canada
- Died: September 1979; Toronto, Ontario, Canada
- Position: Goaltender
- Shot: Left
- Played for: Regina Capitals; Portland Rosebuds
- Playing career: 1911–1936

Hugh Albert Harris "Red" McCusker (June 28, 1895 – September 1979) was a Canadian professional ice hockey goaltender who played in various professional and amateur leagues, including the Western Canada Hockey League. Amongst the teams he played with were the Regina Capitals.

He died at the age of 84 at Toronto in 1979.
