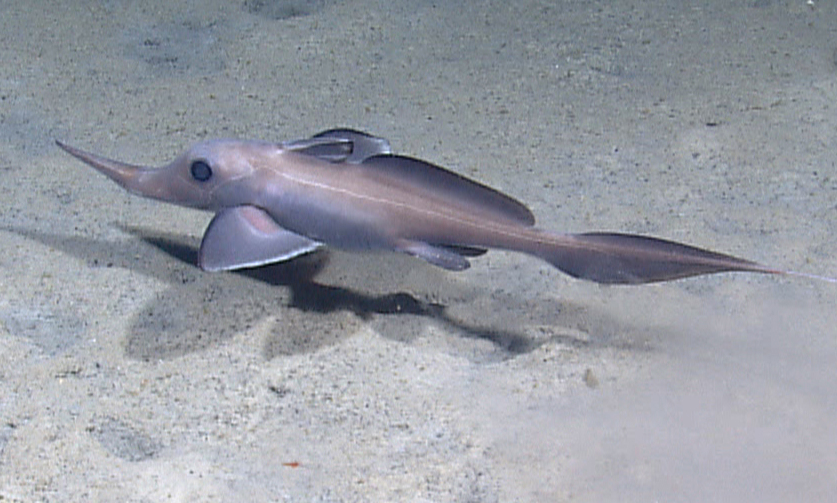
- Harriotta raleighana

Scientific classification
- Kingdom: Animalia
- Phylum: Chordata
- Class: Chondrichthyes
- Subclass: Holocephali
- Order: Chimaeriformes
- Family: Rhinochimaeridae
- Genus: Harriotta; Goode & T. H. Bean, 1895

= Harriotta =

Harriotta Temporal range: Santonian to present

Genus of cartilaginous fishes

Harriotta is a genus of cartilaginous fish in the family Rhinochimaeridae.

The name honours Thomas Harriot (c.1560‒1621), English astronomer, mathematician, ethnographer and translator, who published the first English work on American natural history in 1588.

Some common names for species in the genus include rabbitfish, spookfish and chimaera.

== Distribution ==
Harriotta species can be found in the deep waters of continental slopes around 380 to 2,600 m deep in the Atlantic and the Pacific Oceans. It is also known to be found in the Indian Ocean off of southern Australia. They are also common in the northern Atlantic, northwest Pacific, and southwest Pacific Oceans.

== Species ==
- Harriotta haeckeli Karrer, 1972 (smallspine spookfish)
- †Harriotta lehmani Werdelin, 1986 - Lebanon (Sahel Alma), Late Cretaceous (Santonian)
- Harriotta raleighana Goode & Bean, 1895 (narrownose chimaera)
- †Harriotta gosseleti (Winkler, 1880) Belgium, Oligocene (Rupelian)

Video of an H. sp. taken by Okeanos Explorer

- Harriotta avia Finucci, Didier, Ebert, Green & Kemper, 2024 (Australasian narrow-nosed spookfish)

== See also ==
- List of prehistoric cartilaginous fish
