= Chimaera didierae =

Conservation status
- Data Deficient (IUCN 3.1)

Scientific classification
- Kingdom: Animalia
- Phylum: Chordata
- Class: Chondrichthyes
- Subclass: Holocephali
- Order: Chimaeriformes
- Family: Chimaeridae
- Genus: Chimaera
- Species: C. didierae

Binomial name
- Chimaera didierae Clerkin, Ebert & Kemper, 2017

Species of fish

Chimaera didierae is a chimaera found in the Southwestern Indian Ocean, specifically near Walters Shoals on southern part of Madagascar Ridge.

== Description ==
Chimaera didierae has several general characteristics, such as slender short trunk, relatively sturdy spine, extremely deciduous skin, tiny unpaired fins, and light tan-colored body. The only specimen ever caught has a maximum total length of around 15.6 cm (6.1 in).

== Habitat and distribution ==
This bathydemersal chimaera possibly inhabits the depth of 1,000–1,100 m (3,280–3,610 ft).
