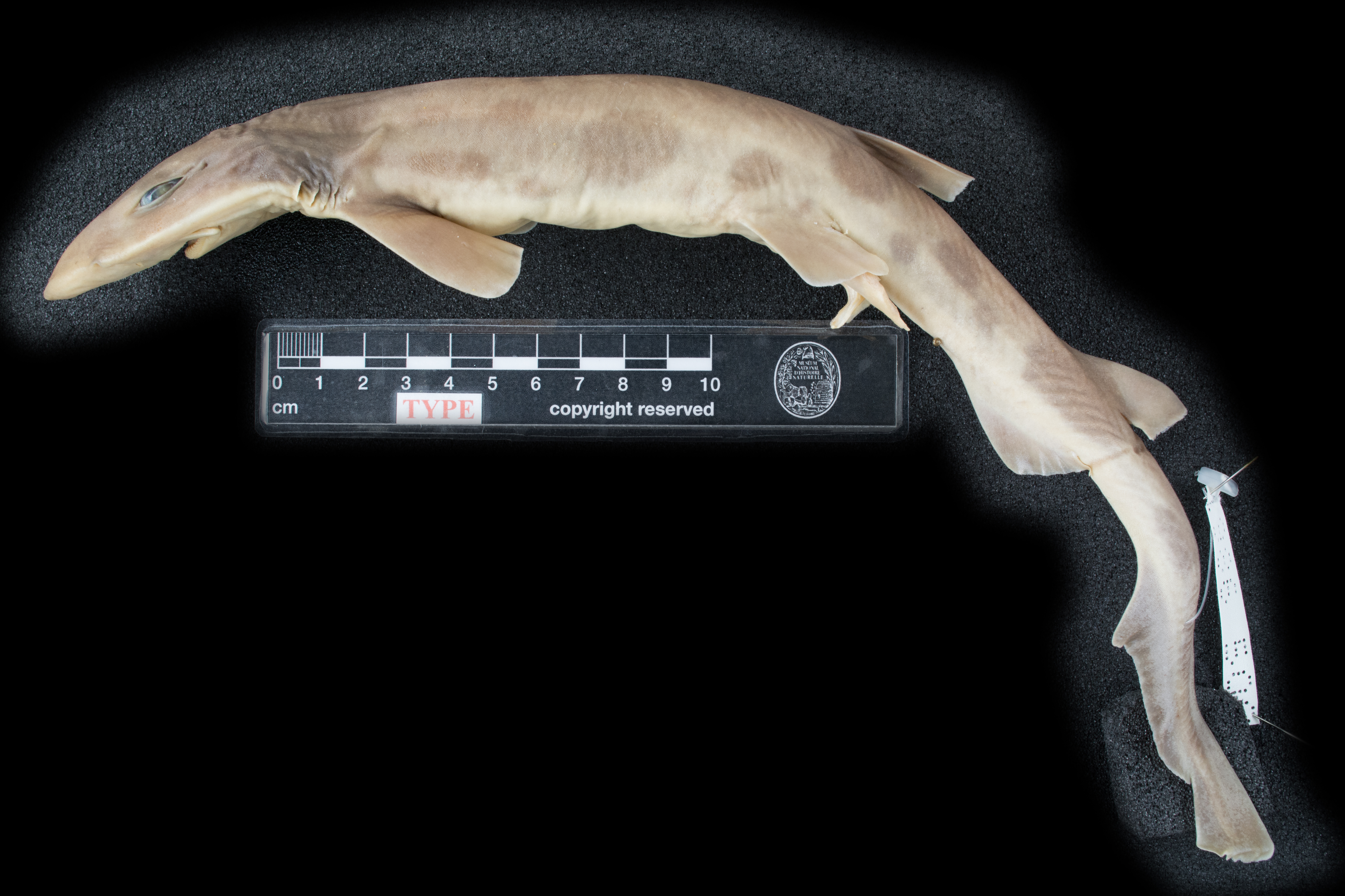

Conservation status
- Data Deficient (IUCN 3.1)

Scientific classification
- Kingdom: Animalia
- Phylum: Chordata
- Class: Chondrichthyes
- Subclass: Elasmobranchii
- Division: Selachii
- Order: Carcharhiniformes
- Family: Pentanchidae
- Genus: Bythaelurus
- Species: B. clevai

Binomial name
- Bythaelurus clevai (Séret, 1987)

Synonyms
- Halaelurus clevai Séret, 1987

= Broadhead catshark =

Species of shark

The broadhead catshark (Bythaelurus clevai) is a species of shark belonging to the family Pentanchidae, the deepwater catsharks. The only specimen, the holotype, was found off Madagascar at a depth between 425 and 500 m (1,394 and 1,640 ft).
