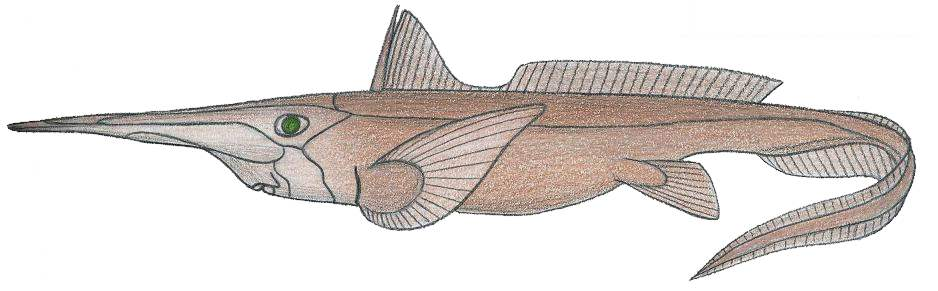

Conservation status
- Least Concern (IUCN 3.1)

Scientific classification
- Kingdom: Animalia
- Phylum: Chordata
- Class: Chondrichthyes
- Subclass: Holocephali
- Order: Chimaeriformes
- Family: Rhinochimaeridae
- Genus: Rhinochimaera
- Species: R. atlantica

Binomial name
- Rhinochimaera atlantica Holt & Byrne, 1909

= Broadnose chimaera =

Species of fish

The broadnose chimaera, knifenose chimaera, spearnose chimaera, Atlantic long-nosed chimaera, or straightnose rabbitfish (Rhinochimaera atlantica) is a species of fish in the family Rhinochimaeridae found near Canada, Colombia, France, Gambia, Iceland, Mauritania, Mexico, Namibia, Senegal, South Africa, Suriname, and the United States.

== Description ==
Rhinochimaera atlantica was described in 1909, having been discovered on the continental slope southwest of Ireland, and, as of 2021, it is the only long-nosed chimaera to have been described from European waters. It has an approximate total length of 15 centimetres (5.9 in) at birth, and reach maturity at 107 centimetres (42 in) total length for males and 127.4 centimetres (50.2 in) total length for females. R. atlantica has a long snout and a straight head profile. Their first dorsal fin is triangular, and the spine of the fin extends beyond the fin tip. It is similar in appearance to Rhinochimaera pacifica, but the two have distinct genetic profiles. They have a maximum total length of at least 147 centimetres (58 in).

== Distribution and habitat ==
Rhinochimaera atlantica occurs primarily over soft substrate, and has been found in depths from 400–1,849 metres (1,312–6,066 ft). Its natural habitat is open seas.

== Reproduction ==
Rhinochimaera atlantica is oviparous. Its egg case is spindle shaped, with a convex dorsal side and a concave ventral side. It has a wide flange which is ribbed, and the spindle has a teardrop shape.

== Conservation ==
Rhinochimaera atlantica is categorised as Least Concern on the IUCN Red List as it is not targeted and only occasionally taken as a bycatch by trawling fisheries, with no known impact on the population.
