= Sicklefin chimaera =

Conservation status
- Near Threatened (IUCN 3.1)

Scientific classification
- Kingdom: Animalia
- Phylum: Chordata
- Class: Chondrichthyes
- Subclass: Holocephali
- Order: Chimaeriformes
- Family: Rhinochimaeridae
- Genus: Neoharriotta
- Species: N. pinnata

Binomial name
- Neoharriotta pinnata (Schnakenbeck, 1931)

Species of fish

The sicklefin chimaera (Neoharriotta pinnata) is a species of fish in the family Rhinochimaeridae found near Angola, the Republic of the Congo, the Democratic Republic of the Congo, Gabon, Ghana, Guinea, Liberia, Mauritania, Namibia, Senegal, Sierra Leone, and Western Sahara. It is also reported from Gulf of Mannar, India. Its natural habitat is open seas.

== Description ==
Neoharriotta pinnata has a total length of approximately 13–23 centimetres (5.1–9.1 in) at birth and reach maturity at a total length of 105–127 centimetres (41–50 in). N pinnata has a long and narrow snout which is blunt at its edge. The spine of its first dorsal fin is taller than the fin itself. Its body is uniformly brown in colour. It has short, broad, and rounded pectoral fins.

== Distribution and habitat ==
Neoharriotta pinnata has been found to occur at depths of 0–4,513 metres (0–14,806 ft), but primarily between 150–750 metres (490–2,460 ft).

Apart from its regular distribution, a single specimen has been found in the Bay of Biscay. In 2018, it was reported in the waters of the Andaman and Nicobar Islands.

== Reproduction ==
The sicklefin chimaera is oviparous, and its egg cases are spindle-shaped and reach 25–30 centimetres (9.8–11.8 in) in length and 9–10 centimetres (3.5–3.9 in) in width.

== Conservation ==
The sicklefin chimaera is categorised globally on the IUCN Red List as near threatened due to local reductions in population across multiple countries due to fishing.
