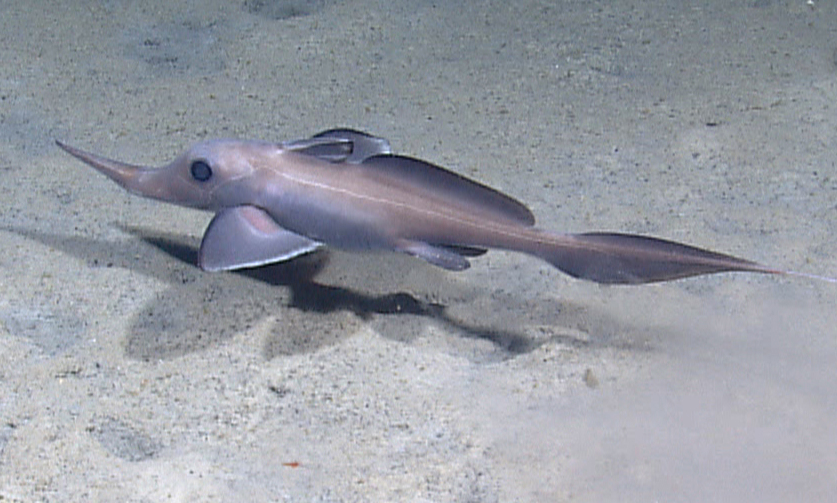
- Narrownose chimaera (Harriotta raleighana)

Scientific classification
- Kingdom: Animalia
- Phylum: Chordata
- Class: Chondrichthyes
- Subclass: Holocephali
- Order: Chimaeriformes
- Family: Rhinochimaeridae; Garman, 1901

Genera
- Harriotta; Neoharriotta; Rhinochimaera

= Rhinochimaeridae =

Rhinochimaeridae Temporal range: Santonian to recent

Family of cartilaginous fishes

The Rhinochimaeridae, commonly known as long-nosed chimaeras, are a family of cartilaginous fish. They are similar in form and habits to other chimaeras, but have an exceptionally long conical or paddle-shaped snout. The snout has numerous sensory nerve endings, and is used to find food such as small fish. The first dorsal fin includes a mildly venomous spine, used in defense.

Long-nosed chimaeras are found in temperate and tropical seas worldwide, from 200 to 2,000 m (660 to 6,560 ft) in depth. In August 2020, a long-nosed chimaera was brought up from 460 fathoms (2,760 ft; 840 m) off the Grand Banks of Newfoundland.

They range from 60 to 140 cm (2.0 to 4.6 ft) in maximum total length, depending on species.

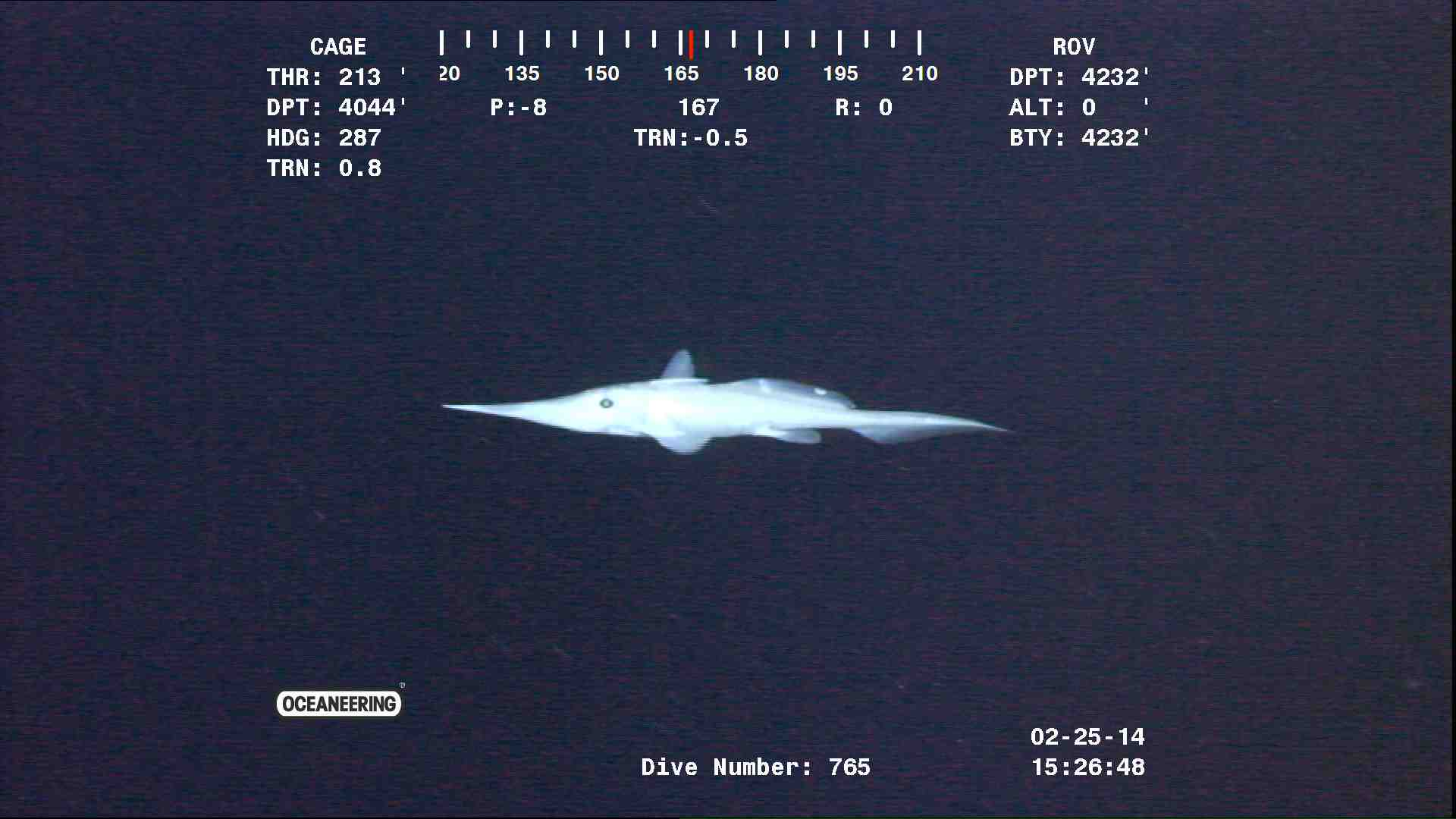
Rhinochimaeridae in the Gulf of Mexico at roughly 4,300 ft (1,300 m) deep

== Species ==
The ten known species are in three genera:

Family Rhinochimaeridae

- Genus Harriotta Goode & Bean, 1895 (Late Cretaceous to present)
  - Harriotta avia Finucci, Didier, Ebert, Green, & Kemper, 2024 (Australasian narrow-nosed spookfish)
  - Harriotta haeckeli Karrer, 1972 (smallspine spookfish)
  - Harriotta raleighana Goode & Bean, 1895 (narrownose chimaera)

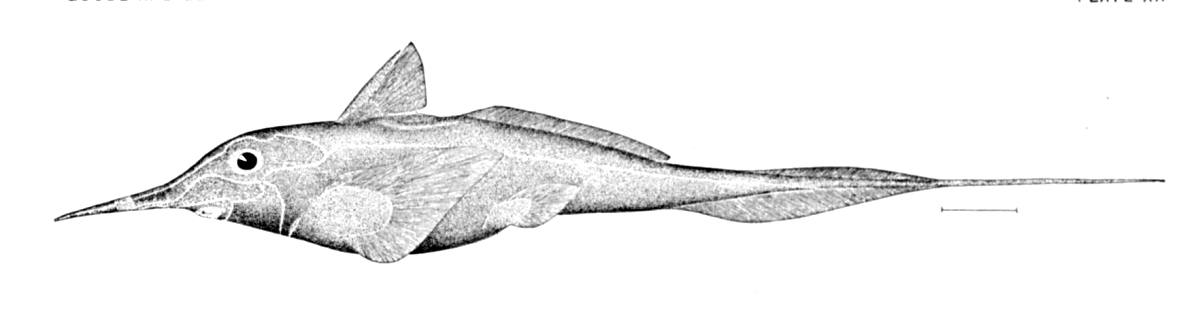
Pacific longnose chimaera, Harriotta raleighana

- Genus Neoharriotta Bigelow & Schroeder, 1950
  - Neoharriotta carri Bullis & J. S. Carpenter, 1966 (dwarf sicklefin chimaera)
  - Neoharriotta pinnata Schnakenbeck, 1931 (sicklefin chimaera)
  - Neoharriotta pumila Didier & Stehmann, 1996 (Arabian sicklefin chimaera)
- Genus Rhinochimaera Garman, 1901
  - Rhinochimaera africana Compagno, Stehmann & Ebert, 1990 (paddlenose chimaera)
  - Rhinochimaera atlantica Holt & Byrne, 1909 (broadnose chimaera)
  - Rhinochimaera costaricana Vidaurre-Quesada, Salas-Jimenez, Carvajal-Rodriguez, Lara-Quesada, Santos, Araripe & Angulo, 2026 (Costa Rican longnose chimaera)
  - Rhinochimaera pacifica Mitsukuri, 1895 (Pacific spookfish)
- Genus †Amylodon Storms, 1895 (Late Cretaceous-Paleogene)
