= Bythaelurus lutarius =

Conservation status
- Data Deficient (IUCN 3.1)

Scientific classification
- Kingdom: Animalia
- Phylum: Chordata
- Class: Chondrichthyes
- Subclass: Elasmobranchii
- Division: Selachii
- Order: Carcharhiniformes
- Family: Pentanchidae
- Genus: Bythaelurus
- Species: B. lutarius

Binomial name
- Bythaelurus lutarius (S. Springer & D'Aubrey, 1972)

Synonyms
- Halaelurus lutarius Springer & D'Aubrey, 1972

Species of shark

The mud catshark or brown catshark (Bythaelurus lutarius) is a species of shark belonging to the family Pentanchidae, the deepwater catsharks. It is found in Mozambique and Somalia. Its natural habitat is the open seas of the western Indian Ocean, from Mozambique to Somalia, between latitudes 13° N and 29° S, at depths between 340 and 765 m. It can grow up to 34 centimetres (13 in) long.
