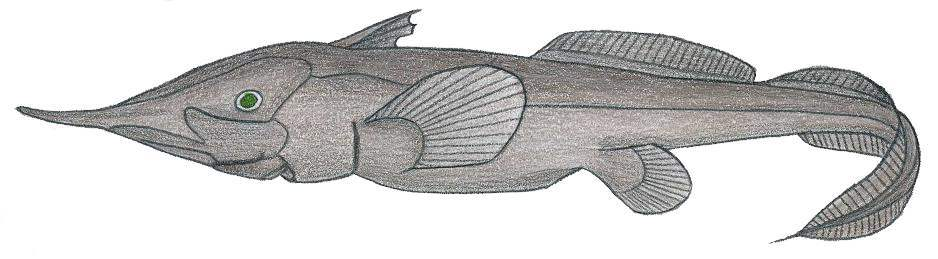

Conservation status
- Least Concern (IUCN 3.1)

Scientific classification
- Kingdom: Animalia
- Phylum: Chordata
- Class: Chondrichthyes
- Subclass: Holocephali
- Order: Chimaeriformes
- Family: Rhinochimaeridae
- Genus: Harriotta
- Species: H. haeckeli

Binomial name
- Harriotta haeckeli Karrer, 1972

= Smallspine spookfish =

Species of fish

The smallspine spookfish (Harriotta haeckeli) is a species of fish in the family Rhinochimaeridae with a rather disjunct population. Its natural habitat is open seas.

== Taxonomy ==
This species was first described by Christine Karrer in 1972. It has been hypothesised that some records of H. raleighana might refer to H. haeckeli.

This species is named in honor of both the research vessel Ernst Haeckel, from which type was collected, and to the eminent zoologist Ernst Haeckel (1834–1919) for whom the ship was named.

== Description ==
H. haeckeli is a small species compared to others in its genus and is coloured pale brown with darker shading on its underside. The species features a broad snout with a slightly concave head profile, with a large head and a tapering body. Approximate total length size reached at maturity is 45cm for males and 60cm for females, with the maximum known length of H. haeckeli reaching 72cm in total length (not including the tail filament).

== Distribution ==
This species can be found off western Greenland, the Canary Islands, northeastern North America, Namibia, the southeastern Indian Ocean, Tasmania and southwestern New Zealand. It normally lives at depths greater than 1100 m. It has been found at depths between 1,114–2,603 metres (3,655–8,540 ft).

== Reproduction ==
Harriotta haeckeli is oviparous.

== Conservation status ==
This species is threatened by habitat loss. However, in June 2018 the New Zealand Department of Conservation classified the smallspine spookfish as "Not Threatened" under the New Zealand Threat Classification System. The IUCN has classified this species as of Least Concern.
