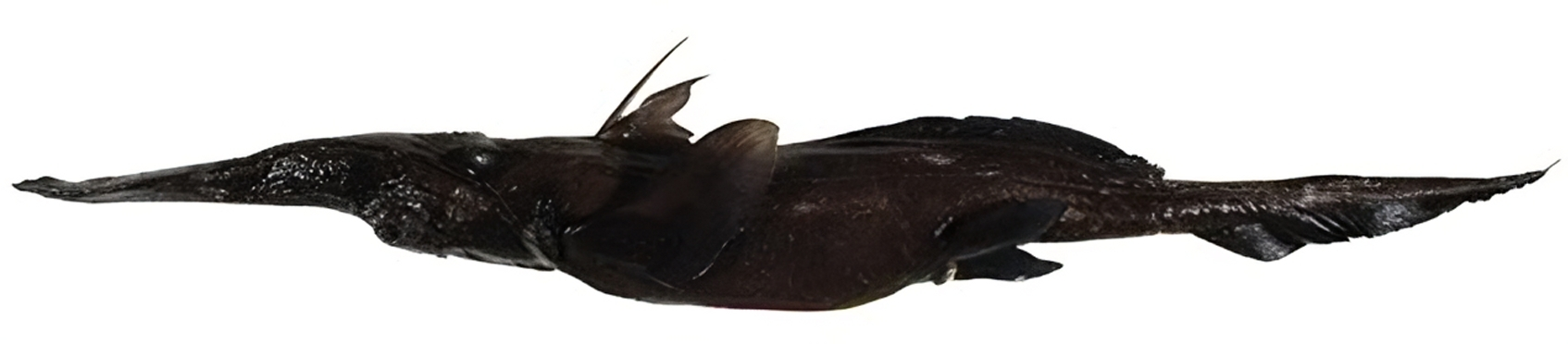

Conservation status
- Least Concern (IUCN 3.1)

Scientific classification
- Kingdom: Animalia
- Phylum: Chordata
- Class: Chondrichthyes
- Subclass: Holocephali
- Order: Chimaeriformes
- Family: Rhinochimaeridae
- Genus: Rhinochimaera
- Species: R. africana

Binomial name
- Rhinochimaera africana Compagno, Stehmann & Ebert, 1990

= Paddlenose chimaera =

Species of fish

The paddlenose chimaera or paddlenose spookfish (Rhinochimaera africana) is a species of marine cartilaginous fish in the family Rhinochimaeridae found near China, Japan, Mozambique, South Africa, and Taiwan.

== Taxonomy ==
Chimaeras are cartilaginous fishes sharing the class Chondrichthyes with sharks and rays. The family Rhinochimaeridae is one of three in the order Chimaeriformes. They are also known as long-nose chimaeras, different from plough-nosed and short-nosed chimaera by their elongated snouts that are either conical or broadened to a paddle-like shape at the anterior end. Rhinochimaera is one of 3 genuses in the family Rhinochimaeridae.

== Appearance ==
It has an elongated, slightly compressed body form. The 2 dorsal fins are separated, and the anterior dorsal fin is led by a hard spine. It possesses a subterminal mouth with flat tooth plates. The name comes from the broad, elongated snout that contains nerve endings on the inferior side meant to detect prey on the sea floor. The snout doesn't broaden before tapering, unlike the related Rhinochimaera pacifica.

== Life History ==
Paddlenose Chimaera are oviparous, and lay 2 eggs at a time. Their eggs are elongated and protected by a rough, hard casing. Adults are benthic feeders, found in waters deeper than 500m. Its diet likely consists of shelled invertebrates, given its flat tooth plates. Longevity of this particular species is unknown, but chimaera species have relatively long lifespans, possibly living more than 30 years.

== Conservation ==
Currently considered a species with no sustainability concerns. Listed under Least Concern by the IUCN Redlist.
