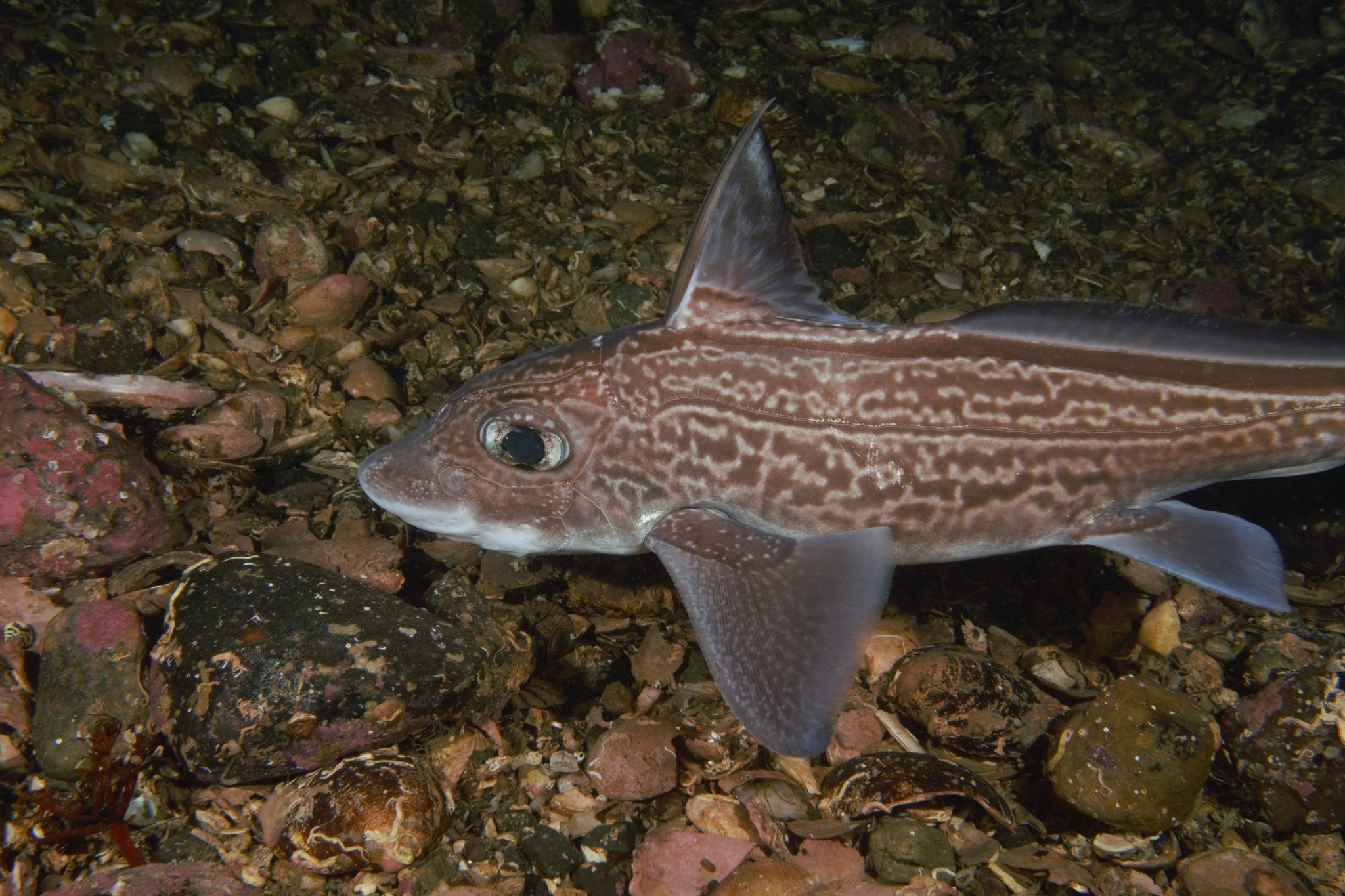
- Chimaera monstrosa (Norway)

Conservation status
- Vulnerable (IUCN 3.1)

Scientific classification
- Kingdom: Animalia
- Phylum: Chordata
- Class: Chondrichthyes
- Subclass: Holocephali
- Order: Chimaeriformes
- Family: Chimaeridae
- Genus: Chimaera
- Species: C. monstrosa

Binomial name
- Chimaera monstrosa Linnaeus, 1758

= Rabbit fish =

Species of cartilaginous fish

Chimaera monstrosa, commonly known as the rabbit fish or rat fish, is a northeast Atlantic and Mediterranean species of cartilaginous fish in the family Chimaeridae. The rabbit fish is known for its characteristically large head and small, tapering body. With large eyes, nostrils, and tooth plates, the head gives them a rabbit-like appearance, hence the nickname "Rabbit fish". They can grow to 1.5 metres (5 ft) and live for up to 30 years.

== Description ==
Illustration by P. J. Smit

The appearance of C. monstrosa shares characteristics of its distant relatives, sharks. It characteristically has a large head and a tapering body that ends in its whip-like tail, and has a short snout with an overhanging mouth. The top dorsal fin is positioned high on the spine of the fish, and is triangular and tall in height, with the fin spine extending beyond the tip of the fin. Positioned in the mid-section of the fish, the spine runs throughout the length of the fish and continuously joins with the upper part of the caudal fin; this dorsal spine is also mildly poisonous and can cause painful stings. One distinguishing feature of the fish, compared to its close relatives, is the anal fin, which is distinctly separated from its lancet-shaped caudal fin. The color is silver-green with spots of brown. Additionally, they have marmor-white stripes in all directions with a distinct lateral line can be seen clearly on the head.

The rabbit fish can grow up to 1.5 m (5 ft) long, and weigh 2.5 kg (5.5 lb). More specifically, this chimaera species is characterized by a slow-growth rate, and a long life expectancy. In the study of one population, the theoretical asymptotic length of this fish was estimated at 78.87 cm with a yearly growth rate of 6.73% per year. With these estimates of growth, the study also suggests the maximum ages of the fish to be 30 years for males and 26 for females, with the maturity age of the sample being 13.4 years for males and 11.2 years for females.

== Distribution and habitat ==
The geographic habitat of the fish has been registered around the Mediterranean Sea and the Eastern parts of the Atlantic Ocean. This geographic range starts northwards Morocco and extends to the northern areas of Norway and Iceland in the northern North Sea.

Within these geological areas, the depth range of C. monstrosa is 50 to 1,000 metres (160 to 3,280 ft), but it is most abundant in upper to middle continental slope habitats at depths of 300 to 500 metres (980 to 1,640 ft). The maximum reported depth of C. monstrosa is 1,663 metres (5,456 ft). Within these parameters, the water temperatures of the species habitats are most commonly in the range 4.7–8.0 °C (40.5–46.4 °F). There have been reports of summer inshore migration of C. monstrosa to lay eggs in depths as low as 100 m (330 ft). For their habitat, they prefer seabeds of mud or soft substrate.

== Diet ==
Chimaera monstrosa is classified as a benthophagous species. This means that its main diet comprises bottom-feeding invertebrates. This includes animals such as crabs, molluscs, octopuses, sea-worms, and sea urchins. However, studies have also shown that C. monstrosa are opportunistic feeders. Comparing the digestive tracts of individuals with varying body sizes, a study found that the diet of the species was widely diverse in relation to size. Specimens smaller than 22 cm (9 inches) mainly fed on amphipods, while those with lengths between 22 and 46 cm (9 and 18 inches) fed on both amphipods and decapods. Larger individuals (more than 46 cm or 18 inches) had a narrow diet spectrum, consuming mainly decapods. Conditioned by predator size group, significant differences in diet were observed between geographical areas and depths. This suggests that despite some degree of prey specialization according to predator size, this deep-water species can change its diet in accordance with the food-restricted environment that characterizes its habitat.

== Reproduction ==
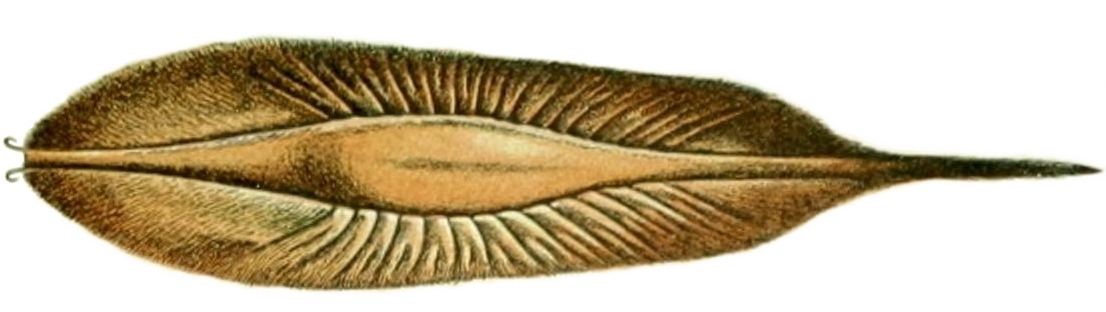
Egg

Chimaera monstrosa are fish that have distinct sex from birth. They reproduce by internal fertilization of male and female. For reproduction, C. monstrosa displays a small club like structure with a bulbous tip armed with numerous sharp denticles located on the top of the head. This structure is suggested to be used by male fish to grasp the pectoral fin of the female during copulation. The species is also oviparous, meaning that the embryo development happens in eggs, and not in the female. Specifically, the reproductive tendencies of the Chimaera monstrosa show sexual segregation in different depths of water, with the females living at lower depths. This segregation of the sexes is attributed to two main factors: the regulation of sperm in males in warmer and shallower waters, and less aggression of sex. For males, they live in water 500–600 m (1,600–2,000 ft) to regulate sperm. For the females, they prefer deeper waters of 800 m (2,600 ft), but go up to depths of 500–600 m (1,600–2,000 ft) to mate with males. After mating, they migrate inshore to lay eggs in the spring and summer. Young hatch from their egg after between 9-12 months.

== Conservation ==
According to the IUCN Red List, Chimaera monstrosa is categorized as vulnerable. Due to its high levels of lipids, the species has gained interest in fisheries for its liver oils to manufacture dietary supplements. Aside from its value for oil, the C. monstrosa is mainly discarded as bycatch in fishing.
