= David A. Ebert =

American ichthyologist

David Anthony Ebert
- Born: August 8, 1958 (age 68); Santa Clara, California, U.S.
- Education: Hartnell College (AA); Humboldt State University (BA); San José State University (MA); Rhodes University (PhD)
- Known for: Research on sharks, rays and chimaeras; discovery and description of little-known shark species
- Scientific career
- Fields: Ichthyology, marine biology
- Workplaces: Moss Landing Marine Laboratories; California Academy of Sciences; South African Institute for Aquatic Biodiversity
- Doctoral advisor: Leonard Compagno
- Other academic advisors: Gregor Cailliet

David Anthony Ebert (born August 8, 1958) is an American ichthyologist who specialises in cartilaginous fish, including sharks, rays and chimaeras. He is known as the "Lost Shark Guy" for his efforts to locate and document little-known and rarely observed shark species.

== Biography ==
Ebert is the son of Margaret E. McCloud and Earl Ebert, a marine biologist. In 1978, he received an Associate of Arts degree from Hartnell College in Salinas, California. In 1980, he graduated from Humboldt State University in Arcata, California, with a bachelor's degree in zoology. In 1984, he earned a Master of Arts degree in marine biology from Moss Landing Marine Laboratories, part of San José State University. His master's thesis, supervised by Gregor Cailliet, was titled Aspects of the life history of California's two cowshark species, Notorynchus cepedianus and Hexanchus griseus. In 1990, he received a PhD in ichthyology and fisheries sciences from Rhodes University in Makhanda, South Africa. His doctoral dissertation, supervised by Leonard Compagno, was titled The taxonomy, biogeography and biology of cow and frilled sharks (Chondrichthyes: Hexanchiformes). In the same year, he completed a postdoctoral appointment at the Iziko South African Museum in Cape Town.

From 1985 to 2005, Ebert worked with Ocean Resources Consultants & Associates (ORCA), a consulting company based in Halifax, Nova Scotia, Canada. From 1991 to 2001, he was involved in abalone research with the National Oceanic and Atmospheric Administration (NOAA). In 2002, he became program director of the Pacific Shark Research Center at Moss Landing Marine Laboratories, where he also serves on the research faculty. Since 2009, he has been a research associate in the Department of Ichthyology at the California Academy of Sciences and at the South African Institute for Aquatic Biodiversity (SAIAB).

Ebert has served as a scientific adviser on shark-related matters to the Food and Agriculture Organization of the United Nations (FAO). His professional affiliations include the IUCN Species Survival Commission Shark Specialist Group, where he has held taxonomic and regional leadership roles, the American Elasmobranch Society, the American Society of Ichthyologists and Herpetologists, and the Oceania Chondrichthyan Society. His research covers the biology, ecology, biogeography, fisheries and systematics of cartilaginous fishes. He has conducted research on six continents and in more than 20 countries, and has supervised graduate students in marine biology.

Ebert has authored or co-authored numerous scientific papers, book chapters and books on sharks and other cartilaginous fishes. His books include Guide to the Sharks and Rays of Southern Africa (1989), Sharks, Rays, and Chimaeras of California (2003), and Sharks of the World (2021). His work has also contributed to assessments of shark species for the IUCN Red List of Threatened Species.

Ebert's research has been featured on the Discovery Channel programme Shark Week and the BBC television series Shark. His continuing research focuses on finding and documenting the world's "lost sharks": little-known species that are rarely observed and remain poorly understood by scientists and the public.

== Taxa described by David A. Ebert ==
The following is a list of selected taxa described by Ebert, either independently or in collaboration with other researchers.

- Acroteriobatus andysabini — Weigmann, Ebert & Séret, 2021
- Acroteriobatus stehmanni — Weigmann, Ebert & Séret, 2021
- Apristurus manocheriani — Cordova & Ebert, 2021
- Bathyraja chapmani — Ebert, Alfaro-Shigueto, Vélez-Zuazo, Pajuelo & Mangel, 2022
- Benthobatis yangi — Carvalho, Compagno & Ebert, 2003
- Bythaelurus bachi — Weigmann, Ebert, Clerkin, Stehmann & Naylor, 2016
- Bythaelurus naylori — Ebert & Clerkin, 2015
- Caliraja — Ebert, 2022
- Centrophorus lesliei — White, Ebert & Naylor, 2017
- Centrophorus longipinnis — White, Ebert & Naylor, 2017
- Centrophorus westraliensis — White, Ebert & Compagno, 2008
- Centrophorus zeehaani — White, Ebert & Compagno, 2008
- Cephaloscyllium hiscosellum — White & Ebert, 2008
- Chimaera bahamaensis — Kemper, Ebert, Didier & Compagno, 2010
- Chimaera buccanigella — Clerkin, Ebert & Kemper, 2017
- Chimaera carophila — Kemper, Ebert, Naylor & Didier, 2014
- Chimaera didierae — Clerkin, Ebert & Kemper, 2017
- Chimaera notafricana — Kemper, Ebert, Compagno & Didier, 2010
- Chimaera supapae — Ebert, Krajangdara, Fahmi & Kemper, 2024
- Chimaera willwatchi — Clerkin, Ebert & Kemper, 2017
- Chlamydoselachus africana — Ebert & Compagno, 2009
- Cruriraja hulleyi — Aschliman, Ebert & Compagno, 2010
- Dipturus lamillai — Concha, Caira, Ebert & Pompert, 2019
- Etmopterus alphus — Ebert, Straube, Leslie & Weigmann, 2016
- Etmopterus benchleyi — Vásquez, Ebert & Long, 2015
- Etmopterus brosei — Ebert, Leslie & Weigmann, 2021
- Etmopterus burgessi — Schaaf-Da Silva & Ebert, 2006
- Etmopterus joungi — Knuckey, Ebert & Burgess, 2011
- Etmopterus lailae — Ebert, Papastamatiou, Kajiura & Wetherbee, 2017
- Etmopterus marshae — Ebert & Van Hees, 2018
- Etmopterus samadiae — White, Ebert, Mana & Corrigan, 2017
- Etmopterus sculptus — Ebert, Compagno & De Vries, 2011
- Hydrolagus alphus — Quaranta, Didier, Long & Ebert, 2006
- Hydrolagus erithacus — Walovich, Ebert & Kemper, 2017
- Hydrolagus mccoskeri — Barnett, Didier, Long & Ebert, 2006
- Hydrolagus melanophasma — James, Ebert, Long & Didier, 2009
- Leucoraja elaineae — Ebert & Leslie, 2019
- Notoraja martinezi — Concha, Ebert & Long, 2016
- Parmaturus nigripalatum — Fahmi & Ebert, 2018
- Planonasus indicus — Ebert, Akhilesh & Weigmann, 2018
- Pristiophorus lanae — Ebert & Wilms, 2013
- Pristiophorus nancyae — Ebert & Cailliet, 2011
- Rhinobatos austini — Ebert & Gon, 2017
- Rhinochimaera africana — Compagno, Stehmann & Ebert, 1990
- Squalus bassi — Viana, Carvalho & Ebert, 2017
- Squatina caillieti — Walsh, Ebert & Compagno, 2011
- Squatina mapama — Long, Ebert, Tavera, Acero P. & Robertson, 2021
- Tetronarce cowleyi — Ebert, Haas & de Carvalho, 2015
- Tetronarce formosa — Haas & Ebert, 2006

== Selected bibliography ==
- Ebert, David A. (1989). Guide to the Sharks and Rays of Southern Africa.
- Ebert, David A. (2003). Sharks, Rays, and Chimaeras of California.
- Ebert, David A.; Dando, Marc; Fowler, Sarah (2021). Sharks of the World. Princeton University Press.
- Heemstra, Phillip C.; Heemstra, Elaine; Ebert, David A.; Holleman, Wouter; Randall, John E., eds. (2022). Coastal Fishes of the Western Indian Ocean. South African Institute for Aquatic Biodiversity.
