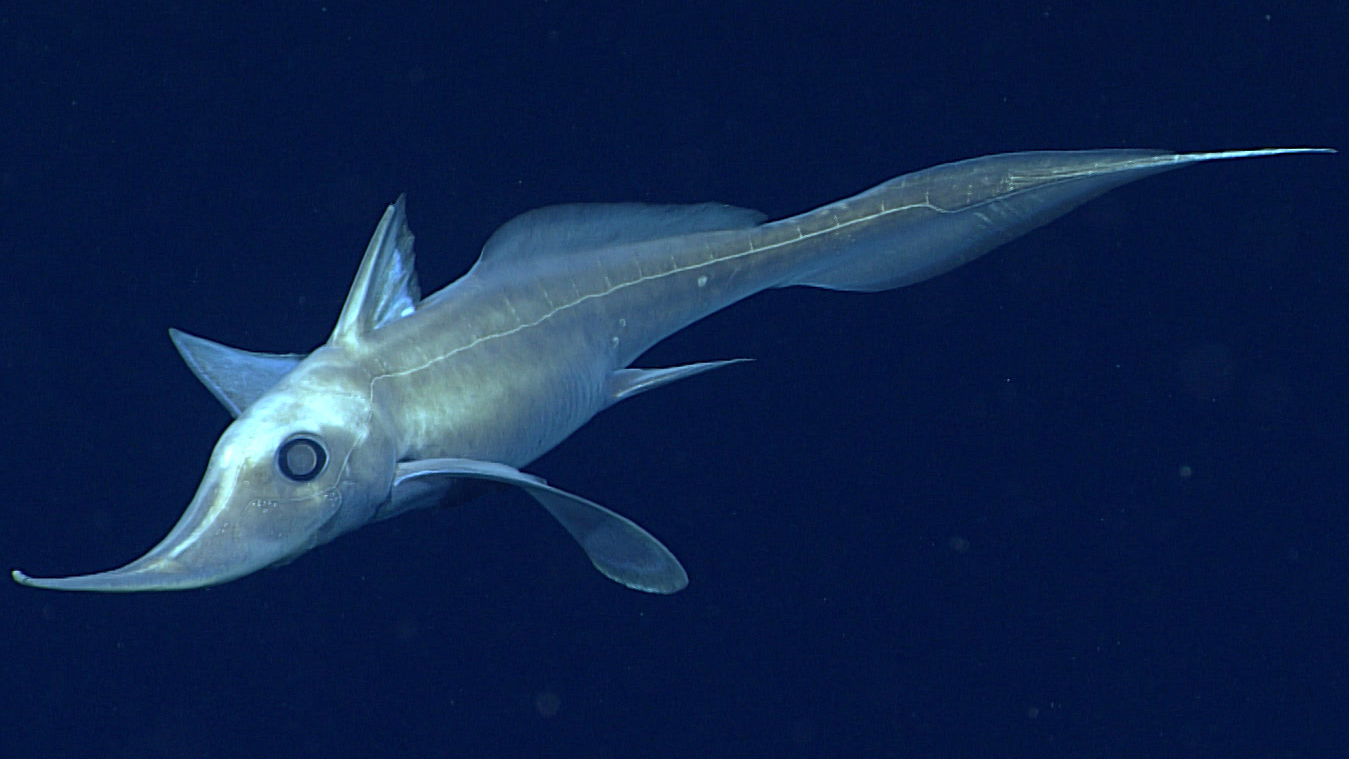

Conservation status
- Least Concern (IUCN 3.1)

Scientific classification
- Kingdom: Animalia
- Phylum: Chordata
- Class: Chondrichthyes
- Subclass: Holocephali
- Order: Chimaeriformes
- Family: Rhinochimaeridae
- Genus: Harriotta
- Species: H. raleighana

Binomial name
- Harriotta raleighana Goode & T. H. Bean, 1895

= Narrownose chimaera =

Species of cartilaginous fish

The narrownose chimaera (Harriotta raleighana) is a longnose chimaera of the family Rhinochimaeridae, the longnose chimaeras, consisting of eight species belonging three genera. This species is found in temperate seas worldwide, at depths between 200 and 3,100 m. Its length is between 1.0 and 1.5 m, including a long, tapering snout and a long, filamentous tail.

== Taxonomy ==
This species was first described by George Brown Goode and Tarleton Hoffman Bean in 1895. The genus Harriotta refers to Thomas Harriot and the species name references Sir Walter Raleigh.

== Description ==
Narrownose chimaeras have elongate rostra, slender tails, large pectoral and pelvic fins, large eyes, and two dorsal fins, the first being preceded by a mildly toxic spine. The spine of their first dorsal fin extends beyond the tip of the fin, and is slightly curved. They possess two pairs of non-replaceable tooth plates in the upper jaw and one pair in the lower jaw. Male H. raleighana are estimated to reach 62.8 cm (24.7 in) and female 75.8 cm (29.8 in) at maturity, respectively. The maximum total length of H. raleighana is approximately 120 centimetres (47 in), and at birth they have a precaudal length of 10–13 centimetres (3.9–5.1 in).

== Habitat ==
The narrownose chimaera is found off Nova Scotia and in much of the rest of the Atlantic Ocean, and in parts of the Pacific Ocean to depths of 3100 metres. Very little is known of their biology due to their deep water habitats. They have been found at depths of 200–3,100 metres (660–10,170 ft), although mostly deeper than 500m, and there is a suspected ontogenetic shift between 200–1,000 metres (660–3,280 ft), with larger specimens living deeper than 1000m.

== Reproduction ==
Longnose chimaeras are members of the class Chondrichthyes, diverging from their closest relatives (sharks, rays, and skates) approximately 400 million years ago. Like many other Chondrichthyes, longnose chimaeras reproduce by laying eggs. Egg cases consist of a central chamber surrounded by a web-like structure and are approximately 16mm long. Female longnose chimaeras lay a pair of eggs several times per season.

== Conservation status ==
The IUCN has classified this species as being of least concern. In June 2018 the New Zealand Department of Conservation classified the narrownose chimaera as "Not Threatened" under the New Zealand Threat Classification System.
