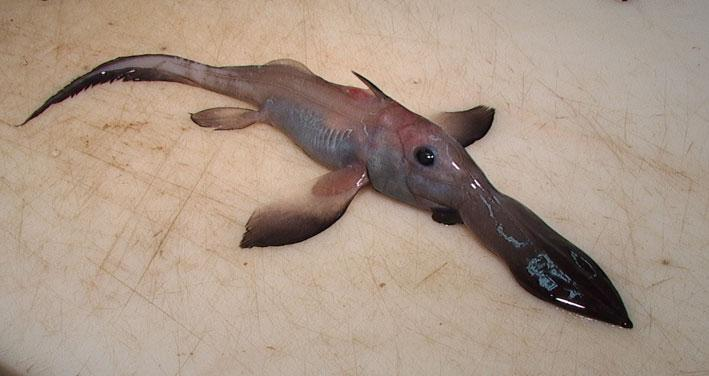

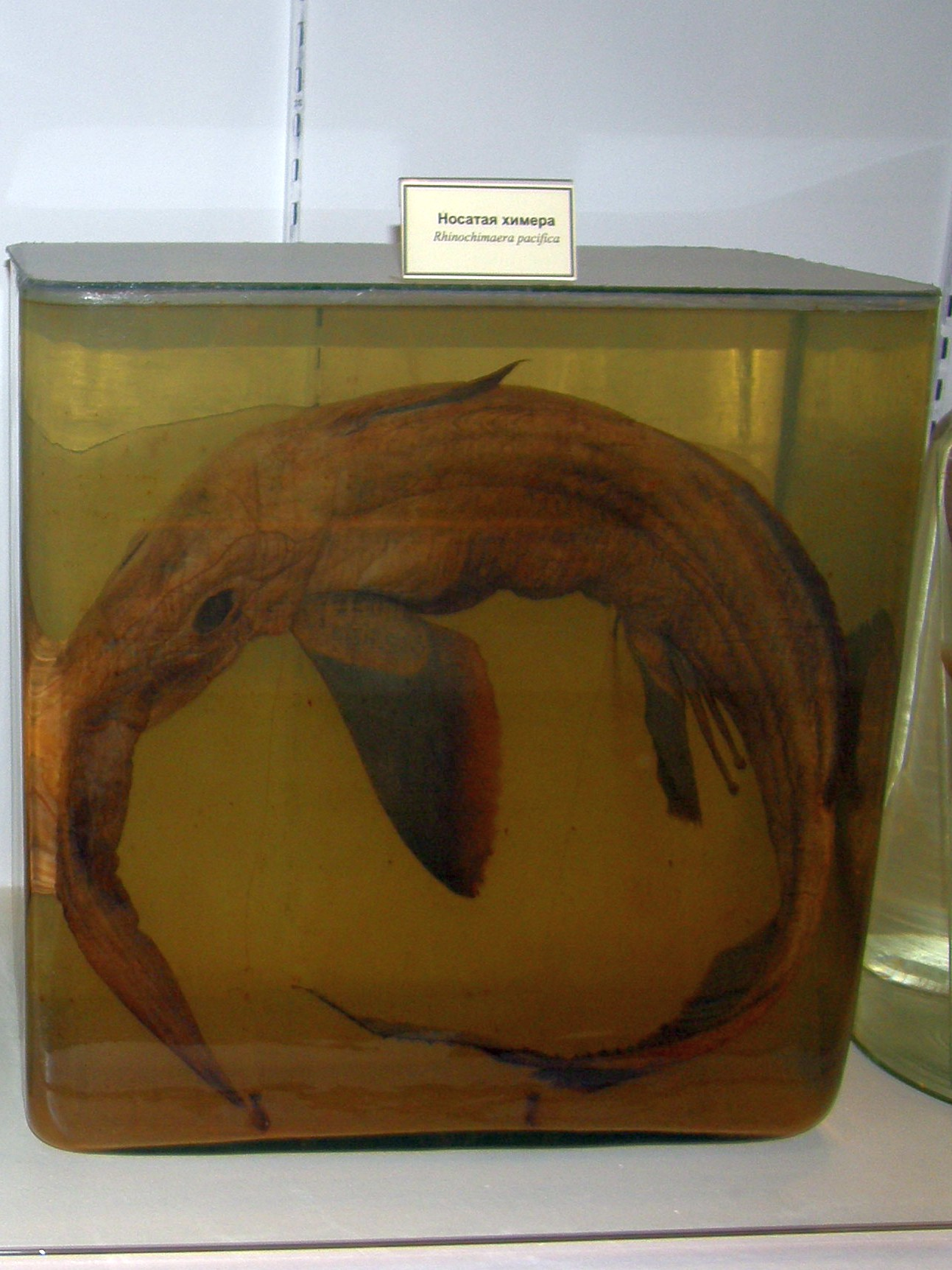

Conservation status
- Least Concern (IUCN 3.1)

Scientific classification
- Kingdom: Animalia
- Phylum: Chordata
- Class: Chondrichthyes
- Subclass: Holocephali
- Order: Chimaeriformes
- Family: Rhinochimaeridae
- Genus: Rhinochimaera
- Species: R. pacifica

Binomial name
- Rhinochimaera pacifica (Mitsukuri, 1895)

= Rhinochimaera pacifica =

Species of chimaera

Rhinochimaera pacifica, commonly known as the Pacific spookfish, knifenose chimaera, narrownose chimaera, Pacific long-nosed chimaera, or Pinocchiofish, is a species of chimaera in the family Rhinochimaeridae. It lives in various parts of the Pacific Ocean and can be characterized by its long snout.

== Description ==
Rhinochimaera pacifica grows to a total length of roughly 130 cm, with a body length of roughly 62 cm. Female specimens are typically larger than males. It has a long, narrow snout and smooth tooth plates. The snout is elongated, and its length can be anywhere from 50 to 87% of the body length, ending at a blunted tip. One of its two dorsal fins is short in length but tall, while the other is lower and longer. Its caudal fin is long, and contains denticles on its upper lobe. It has a brown upperside and a more greyish-brown underside, with a white snout. The edges of the fins tend to be darker in color, ranging from a dark brown to purple color. Specimens in the northwest Pacific have been found to be considerably darker than ones in the southwest Pacific. Juveniles are normally much paler than adults.

== Distribution ==
Rhinochimaera pacifica lives in the northwestern and southwestern parts of the Pacific Ocean. It lives in depths of 760 to 1290 m. In particular, it occurs off Australia, China, Japan, New Zealand, and Taiwan. It also lives off Peru, and may occur in the deeper waters of the rest of the eastern Pacific Ocean. Its population is unknown. It is sometimes taken as a bycatch, but otherwise has few or no threats.

== Conservation status ==
It is assessed as having the conservation status of least concern by IUCN. In June 2018, the New Zealand Department of Conservation classified R. pacifica as "not threatened" with the qualifier "data poor" under the New Zealand Threat Classification System.
