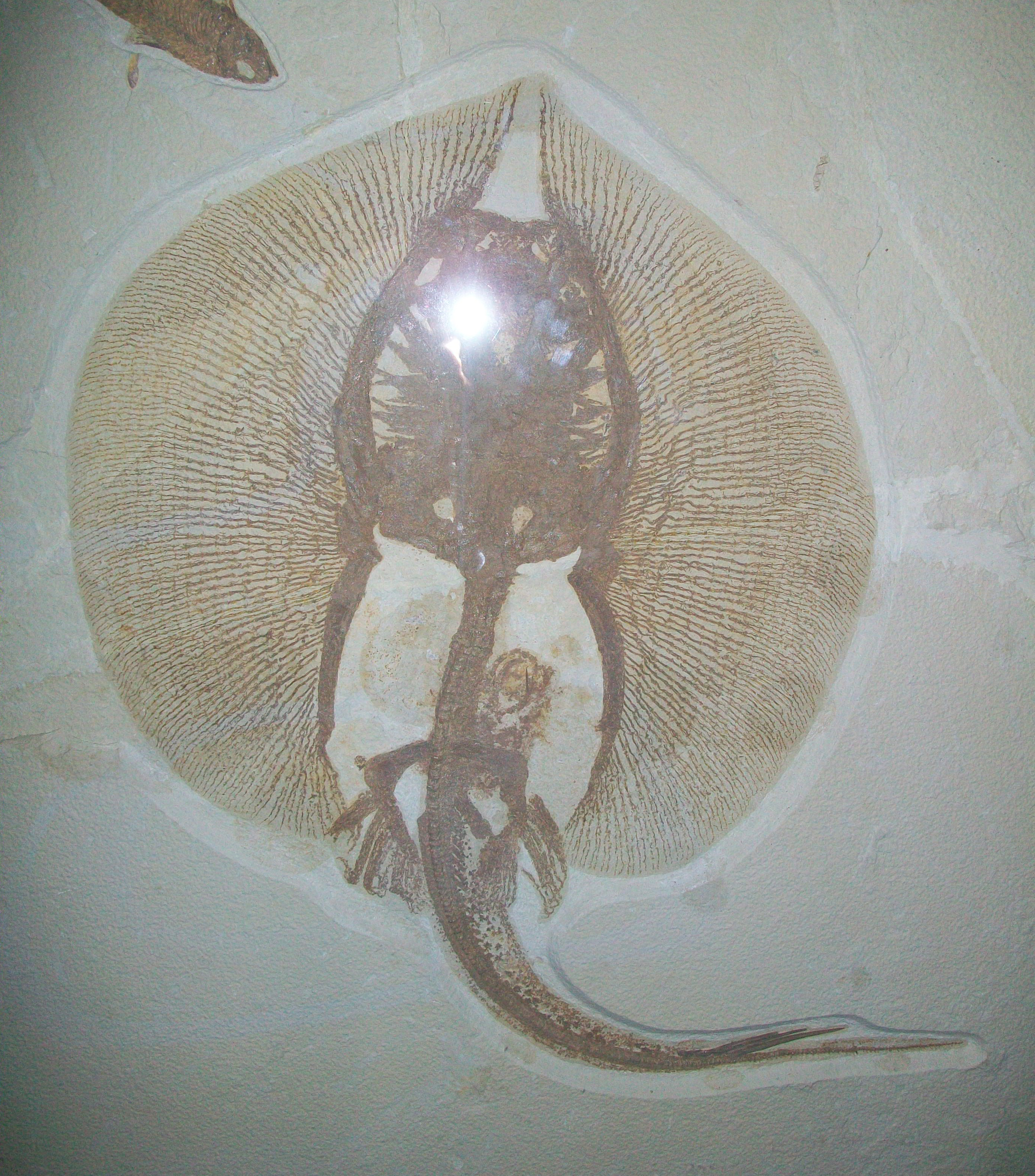
- Holotype specimen of Asterotrygon maloneyi (FMNH PF 15166).

Scientific classification
- Kingdom: Animalia
- Phylum: Chordata
- Class: Chondrichthyes
- Order: Myliobatiformes
- Suborder: Myliobatoidei
- Genus: †Asterotrygon

Species
- †A. maloneyi Carvalho, Maisey & Grande, 2004

= Asterotrygon =

Asterotrygon Temporal range: Early Eocene, 52 Ma

Extinct genus of cartilaginous fishes

Asterotrygon is an extinct genus of stingray from the Eocene Green River Formation in Wyoming. Several complete skeletons representing juveniles, adults, males and females have been uncovered from the late early Eocene Fossil Butte Member of the formation. The type and only species, A. maloneyi, was named in 2004 on the basis of these fossils. Another stingray, Heliobatis, is also known from the formation. Asterotrygon is a primitive stingray closely related to the living family Urolophidae whose ancestors likely originated in the Indo-Pacific. It lived in Fossil Lake, a body of water that existed in a subtropical mountainous region for only about 2 million years.

== Description ==
Asterotrygon had a typical stingray shape with a flat, rounded disk formed from the head and pectoral fins and a long, narrow tail with sharp stingers. It ranged in size from 7.97 centimetres (3.14 in) in the smallest juvenile (the specimen SMMP 83.25) to 65 centimetres (26 in) in the largest adult (FMNH 15166). The shape of the disk is rounder than those of other extinct stingrays such as Heliobatis, which are more diamond-shaped. The upper surface of the disk is covered in small dermal denticles, each with a small hook. Unlike Heliobatis and modern stingrays, it has a small dorsal fin in front of its stingers. While most stingrays have a cartilaginous rod extending from the stinger to the tip of the tail, Asterotrygon retains separate vertebrae throughout the tail's entire length. The tail is also somewhat thicker at its base than those of other stingrays. Small fin-like tail folds are present at the tip of the tail. The puboischiadic girdle, an element to which the pelvic fins attach, is primitively narrow and arch-shaped. Like other stingrays, Asterotrygon lacks thoracic ribs but possesses cartilage around the spine called thoracolumbar synarcual cartilage.

Several details of the neurocranium link Asterotrygon with modern stingrays. Like other stingrays, the hyomandibulae, which allow the jaw to extend outward, are completely separated from the lower jaw. In other cartilaginous fish, the hyomandibulae and lower jaw are fused by the hyomandibular-Meckelian ligament. Despite this loss, Asterotrygon still retains some calcified cartilage in the space where the ligament once was. The postorbital processes behind the eye sockets are broad, flat, and shelf-like.

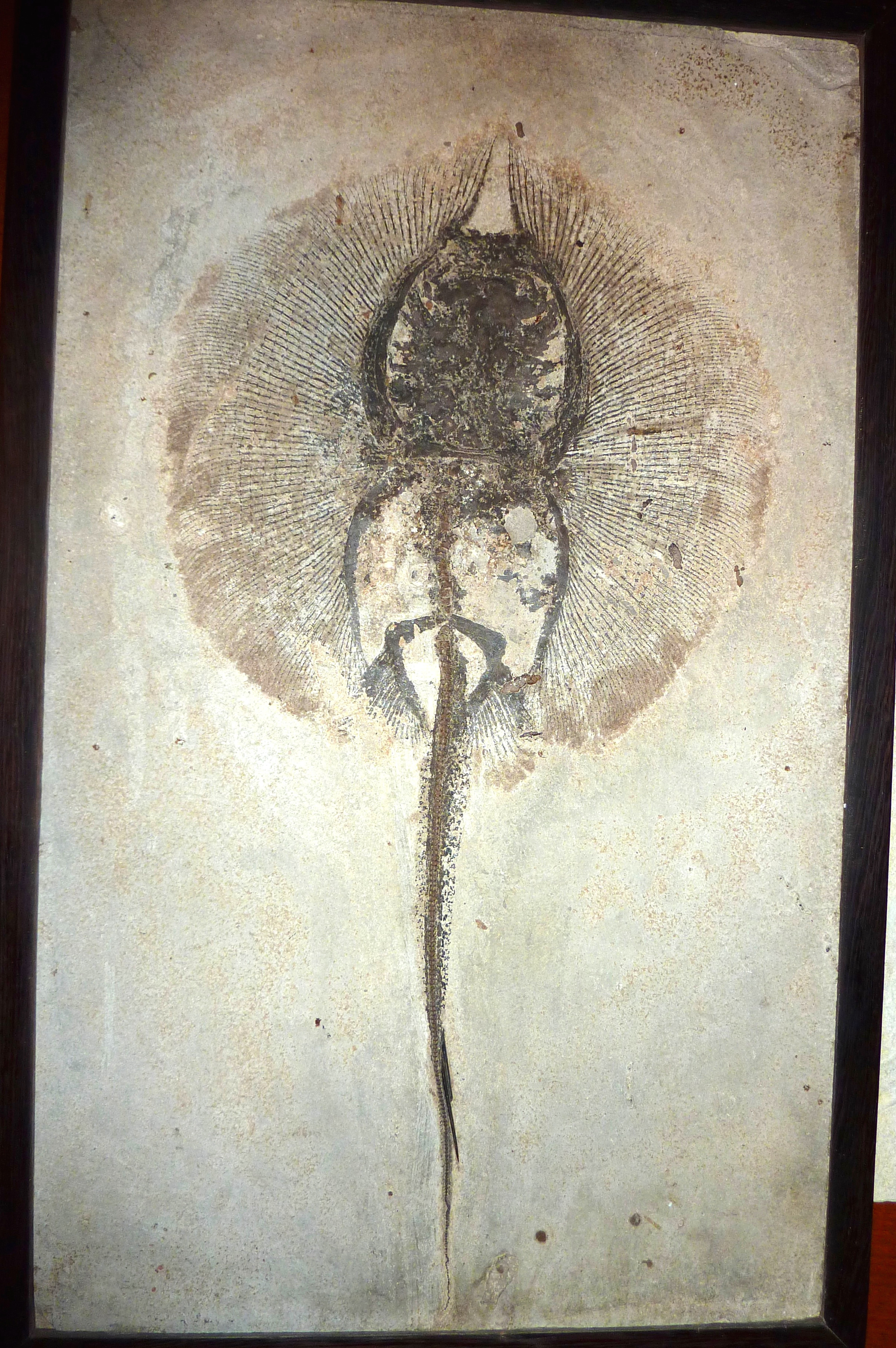
Stingray prepared by R. Lee Craig (Asterotrygon maloneyi). In the collection of Fossil Shack. Prepared Circa 1920.

== History ==
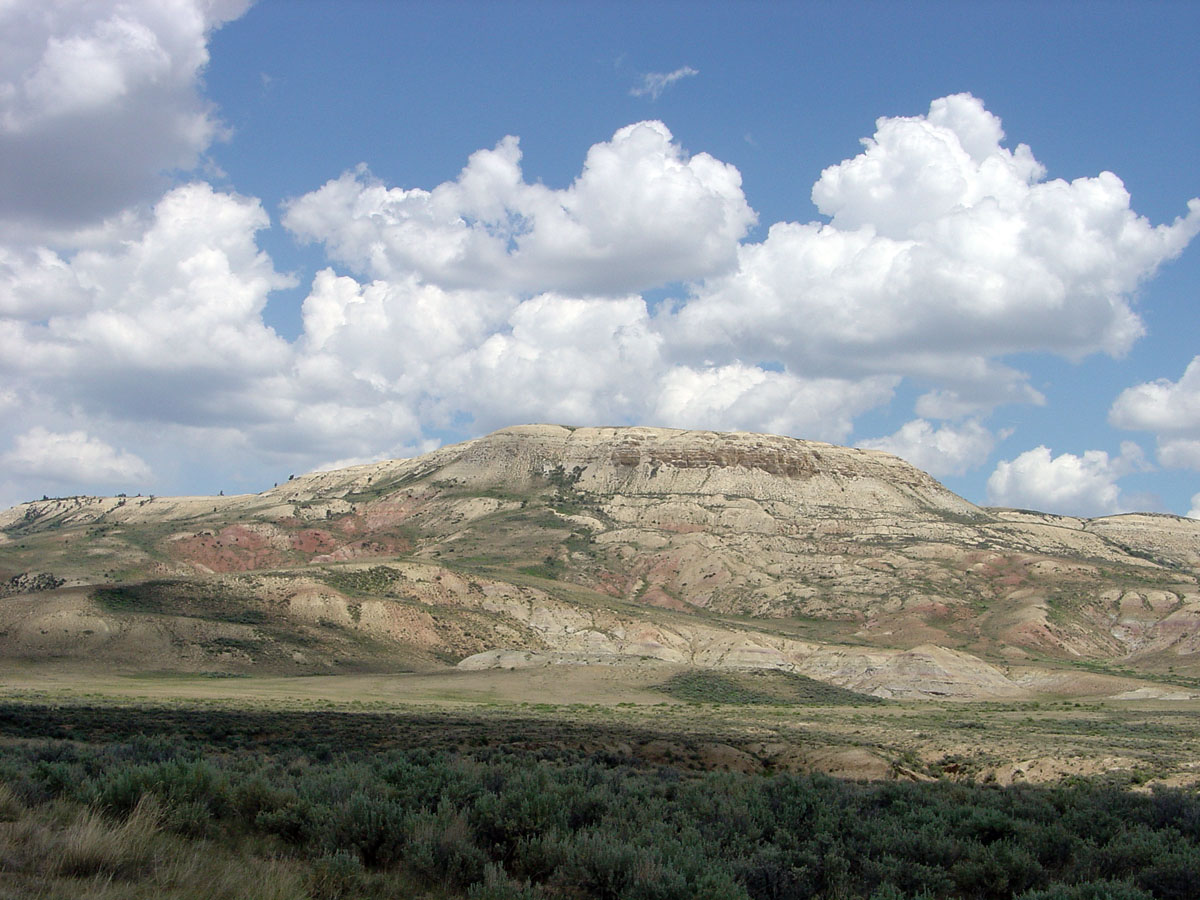
Fossils of Asterotrygon were found in Fossil Butte, Wyoming.

Before the description of Asterotrygon, Heliobatis was the only known stingray in the Green River Formation. American paleontologist Othniel Charles Marsh named Heliobatis radians in 1877, and Xiphotrygon acutidens and Palaeodasybatis discus were subsequently named from the formation in 1879 and 1947, respectively. These stingrays were later synonymized with Heliobatis.

In 1980, a Green River fossil called AMNH P 11557 was described that included a female stingray and two smaller individuals thought to be aborted fetuses. A second specimen called FMNH PF 15166 included a female and a fetus that was still in an embryo within the animal. The genus Asterotrygon was erected in 2004 along with the type species A. maloneyi, and FMNH PF 15166 was designated the holotype specimen. AMNH P 11557 and many other complete fossils were also referred to A. maloneyi. Hundreds of fossils of Heliobatis have been found, while Asterotrygon is represented by a few dozen specimens. Asterotrygon means "star stingray" from the Greek asteros ("star") and trygon ("stingray") after the star-like shape of the base of each denticle. The type species A. maloneyi was named after Thomas and Hilda Maloney, who donated the paratype specimen AMNH P 11557 to the American Museum of Natural History.

Although Asterotrygon is not the earliest stingray (they were present as early as the Early Cretaceous, it is one of the most well-preserved of the early forms. Most earlier stingrays are known only from small teeth, dermal denticles, or stingers, but not entire bodies.

== Classification ==
Asterotrygon is classified as basal stingray within Myliobatoidei. Only Hexatrygon, the living Sixgill stingray, is more basal. Despite living alongside each other, Asterotrygon and Heliobatis are not closely related. Neither are classified in any living family of stingrays, although a 2004 phylogenetic analysis found Heliobatis to be closely related to a clade including river stingrays and whiptail stingrays. Asterotrygon is more closely related to Urolophidae, the stingarees, and Plesiobatis, the Deepwater stingray. Both types are from the Indo-Pacific. Below is a cladogram showing the phylogenetic relationships of Asterotrygon from Carvalho et al. (2004):

- Batoidea
  - Rhinobatos
  - Raja
  - Myliobatoidei (stingrays)
    - Hexatrygon (Sixgill stingray)
    - - †Asterotrygon
      - Plesiobatis (Deepwater stingray)
      - Urolophidae (stingarees)
        - Urolophus
        - Trygonoptera
      - - Urotrygonidae (round rays)
          - Urobatis
          - Urotrygon
        - - †Heliobatis
          - - Potamotrygonidae (river stingrays)
              - Paratrygon
              - - Plesiotrygon
                - Potamotrygon
            - Dasyatidae (whiptail stingrays)
              - Taeniura (ribbontail stingrays)
              - Himantura (whiprays)
              - Dasyatis
              - Pteroplatytrygon (Pelagic stingray)
              - - Gymnura (Butterfly ray)
                - Myliobatidae (eagle rays)
                  - Myliobatis
                  - - Aetobatus
                    - - Rhinoptera (cownose rays)
                      - Mobula (devil rays)

== Paleobiology ==
Asterotrygon is closely related to Pacific stingrays. Its ancestors probably originated in the western Pacific or Indo-Pacific. In contrast, the contemporaneous Heliobatis probably evolved from stingrays that were already present in the Americas. Because the two genera are not closely related, their ancestors probably colonized the Green River Formation lakes in two separate but closely timed events. Neither Asterotrygon nor Heliobatis are known outside the Green River Formation, so they probably evolved within the lakes.

Asterotrygon and other organisms from the Green River Formation lived in subtropical lakes in a mountainous region. These lakes existed for a very long time, some up to 15 million years. The oldest modern lakes have existed for only a few million years, and the vast majority only a few thousand. Three major lakes are known: Fossil Lake, Lake Gosiute, and Lake Uinta. Although it was the shortest-lived, Fossil Lake preserved the most fossils, including all stingray fossils. Fossil Lake is one of two areas that preserve complete stingray fossils; the other, the Monte Bolca Formation in Italy, preserves stingrays that lived in a marine lagoon behind a coral reef. Monte Bolca preserves a greater diversity of rays, including guitarfishes and electric rays. More rays may have lived in Monte Bolca because it was a marine environment; today, most stingrays live in the ocean and only a few live in fresh water.

Fossil Lake was a freshwater lake in a semitropical environment. The modern Gulf Coast and southern Atlantic regions of the United States have been used as modern analogues to the environment. Asterotrygon is found in two types of deposits. One group of fossil localities is called F-1 or the "18-inch layer" and includes limestone that was deposited in the middle of fossil lake over a few hundred years. These sediments were thought to have formed in a deep area where the lake bottom was anoxic. The F-2 layer is thicker, up to 4 metres (13 ft), and was deposited over a longer period of time, possibly several thousand years. F-2 limestone was deposited closer to the north and southeastern shorelines of the lake where the water was richer in dissolved oxygen and organic material.
