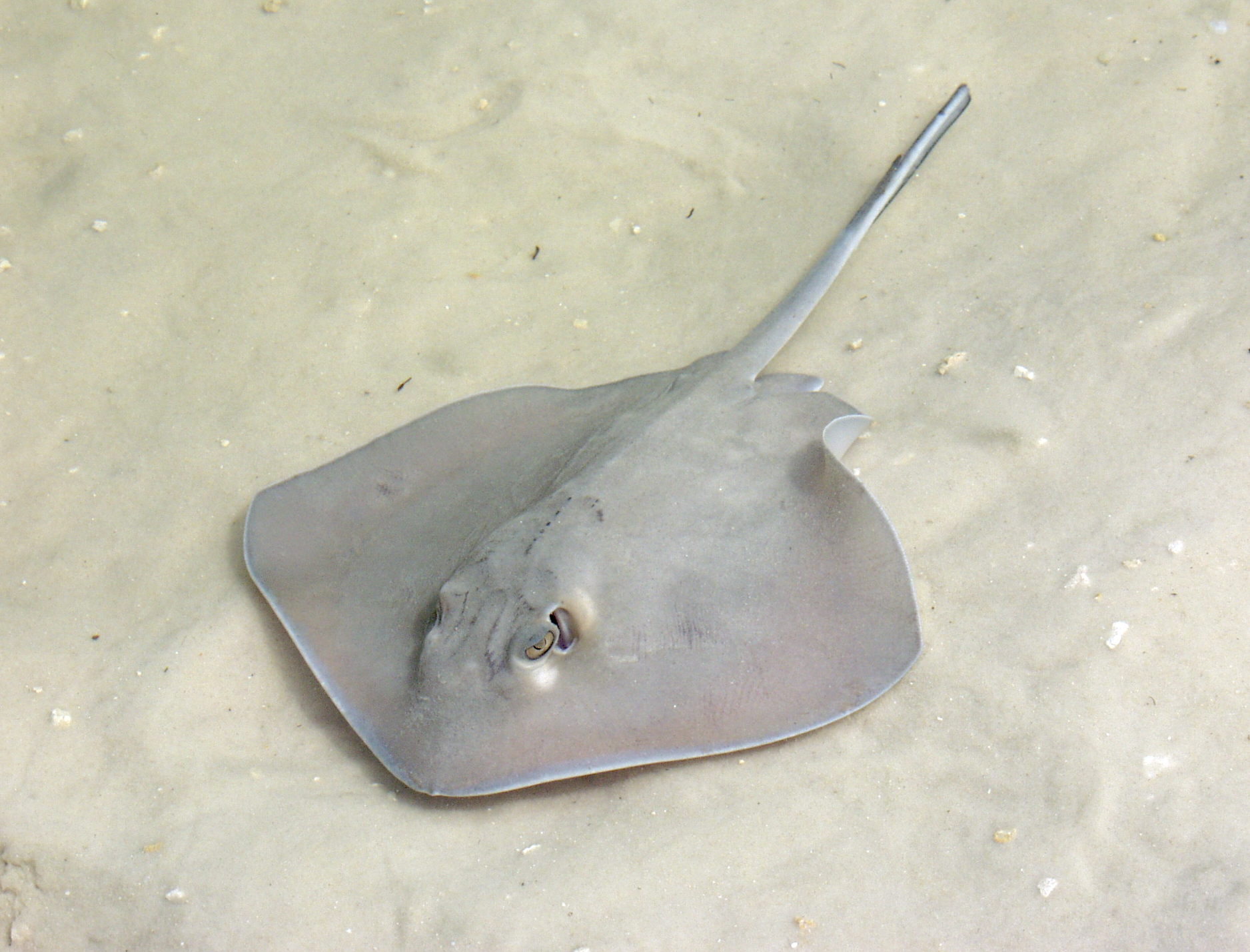
- Southern stingray (Hypanus americanus)

Scientific classification
- Kingdom: Animalia
- Phylum: Chordata
- Class: Chondrichthyes
- Subclass: Elasmobranchii
- Order: Myliobatiformes
- Suborder: Myliobatoidei; Compagno, 1973

Families
- Hexatrygonoidea; Hexatrygonidae; Urolophoidea; Plesiobatidae; Urolophidae; Dasyatoidea; Urotrygonidae; Dasyatidae; Potamotrygonidae; Gymnuridae; †Dasyomyliobatidae; Myliobatidae; †Rhombodontidae

= Stingray =

Stingrays Temporal range: Early Cretaceous to recent

Suborder of fishes

Stingrays are a group of rays, a type of cartilaginous fish. They are classified in the suborder Myliobatoidei of the order Myliobatiformes and consist of eleven families: Hexatrygonidae (sixgill stingrays), Gymnuridae (butterfly rays), Plesiobatidae (deepwater stingrays), Urolophidae (round stingrays), Myliobatidae (eagle rays), Aetobatidae (pelagic eagle rays), Mobulidae (manta and devil rays), Rhinopteridae (cownose rays), Dasyatidae (whiptail stingrays), Potamotrygonidae (river stingrays), and Urotrygonidae (American round stingrays). There are about 220 known stingray species organized into 29 genera.

Stingrays are common in coastal tropical and subtropical marine waters throughout the world. Some species, such as the thorntail stingray (Dasyatis thetidis), are found in warmer temperate oceans and others, such as the deepwater stingray (Plesiobatis daviesi), are found in the deep ocean. The river stingrays and a number of whiptail stingrays (such as the Niger stingray (Fontitrygon garouaensis)) are restricted to fresh water. Most myliobatoids are demersal (inhabiting the next-to-lowest zone in the water column), but some, such as the pelagic stingray and the eagle rays, are pelagic.

Stingray species are progressively becoming threatened or vulnerable to extinction, particularly as a consequence of unregulated fishing. As of 2013, 45 species have been listed as vulnerable or endangered by the IUCN. The status of some other species is poorly known, leading to their being listed as data deficient.

== Evolution ==
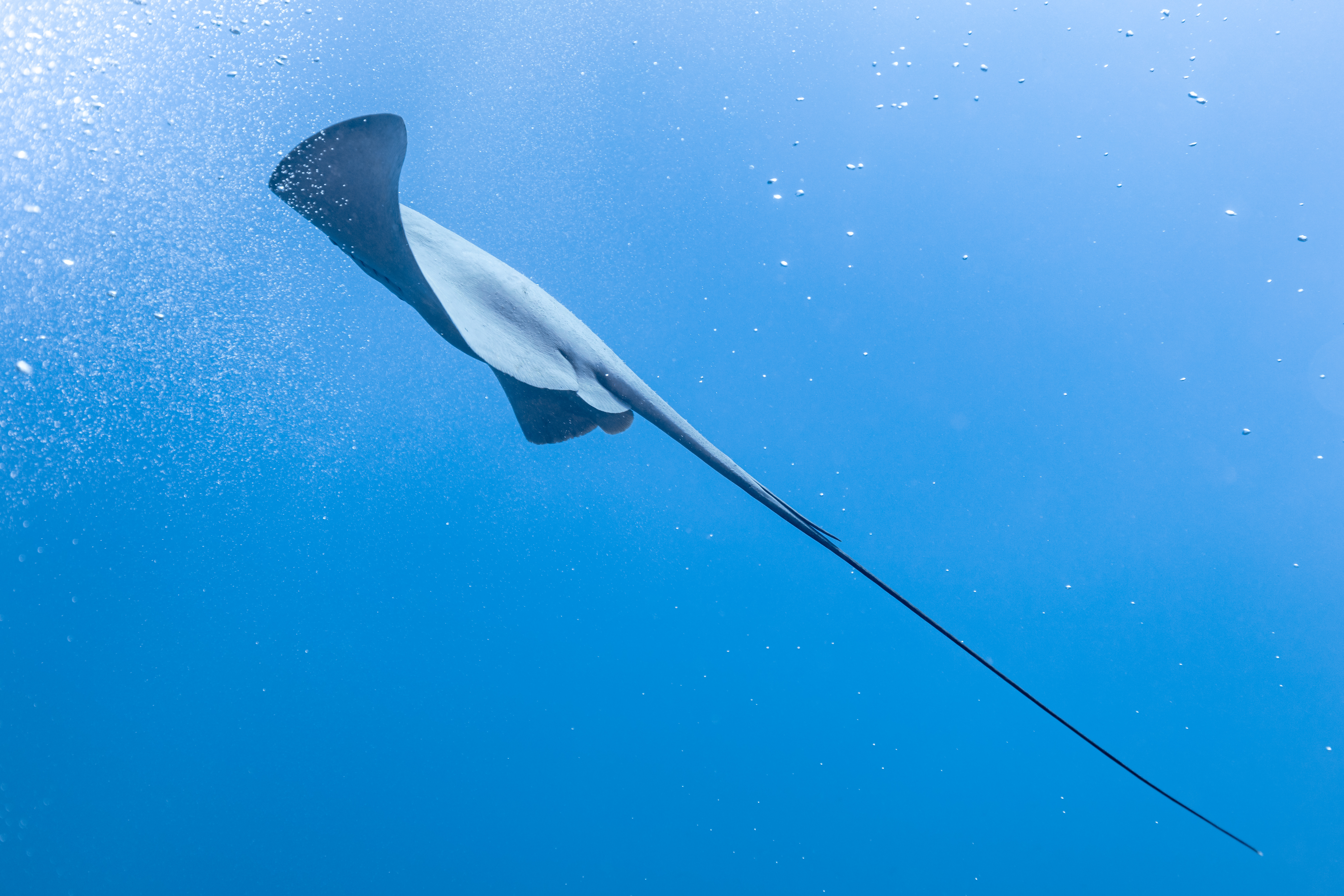
A pelagic stingray.

Stingrays diverged from their closest relatives, the panrays, during the Late Jurassic period, and diversified over the course of the Cretaceous into the different extant families today. The earliest stingrays appear to have been benthic, with the ancestors of the eagle rays becoming pelagic during the early Late Cretaceous.

=== Fossils ===
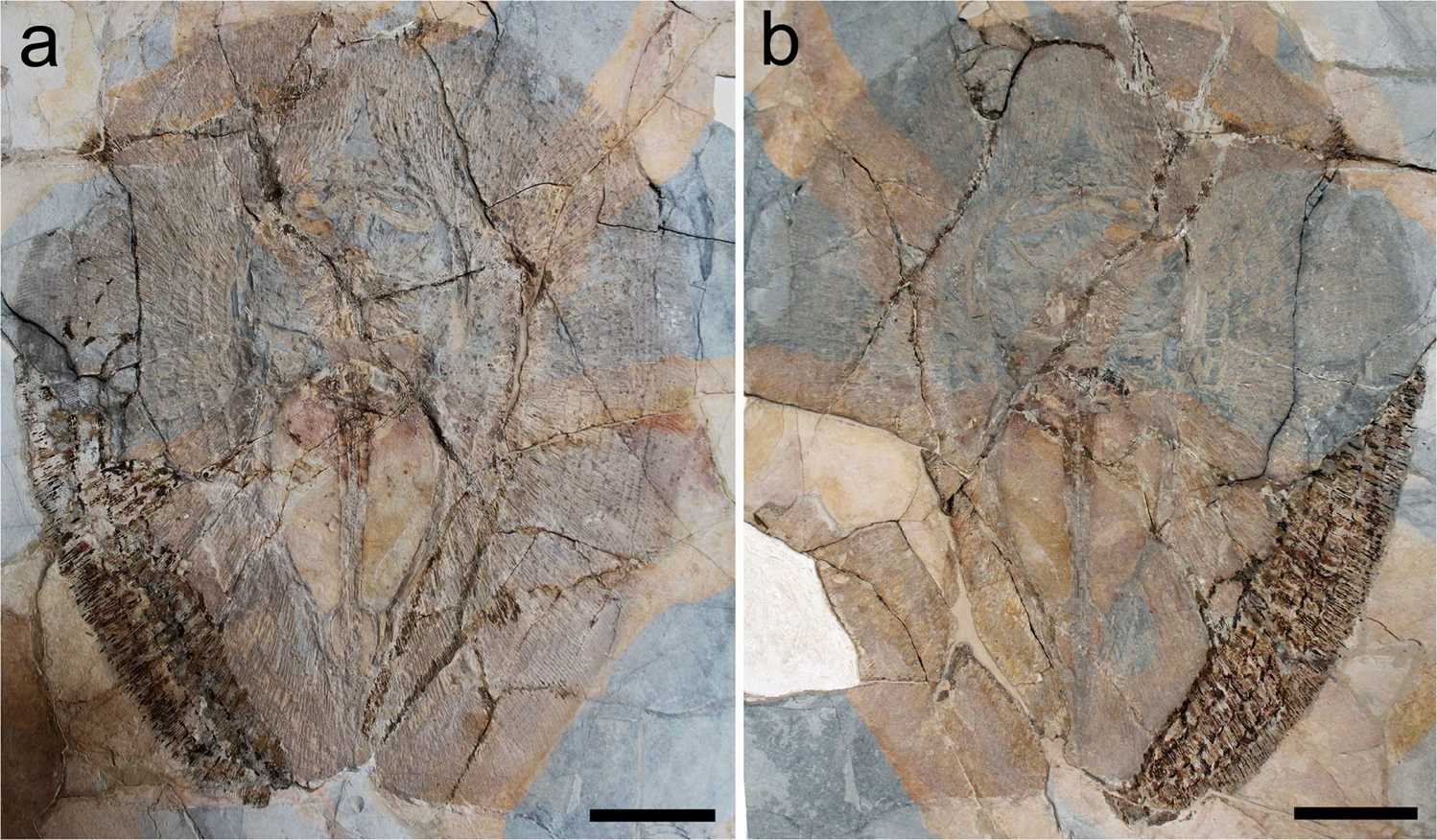
The bizarre Lessiniabatis of Early Eocene Italy

Permineralized stingray teeth have been found in sedimentary deposits around the world as far back as the Early Cretaceous. The oldest known stingray taxon is "Dasyatis" speetonensis from the Hauterivian of England, whose teeth most closely resemble that of the extant sixgill stingray (Hexatrygon). Although stingray teeth are rare on sea bottoms compared to the similar shark teeth, scuba divers searching for the latter do encounter the teeth of stingrays.

Full-body stingray fossils are rare but are known from certain lagerstätten that preserve soft-bodied animals. The extinct Cyclobatis of the Cretaceous of Lebanon is thought to be a skate that had convergently evolved a highly stingray-like body plan, although its exact taxonomic placement is still uncertain. True stingray fossils become more common in the Eocene, with the extinct freshwater stingrays Heliobatis and Asterotrygon known from the Green River Formation.

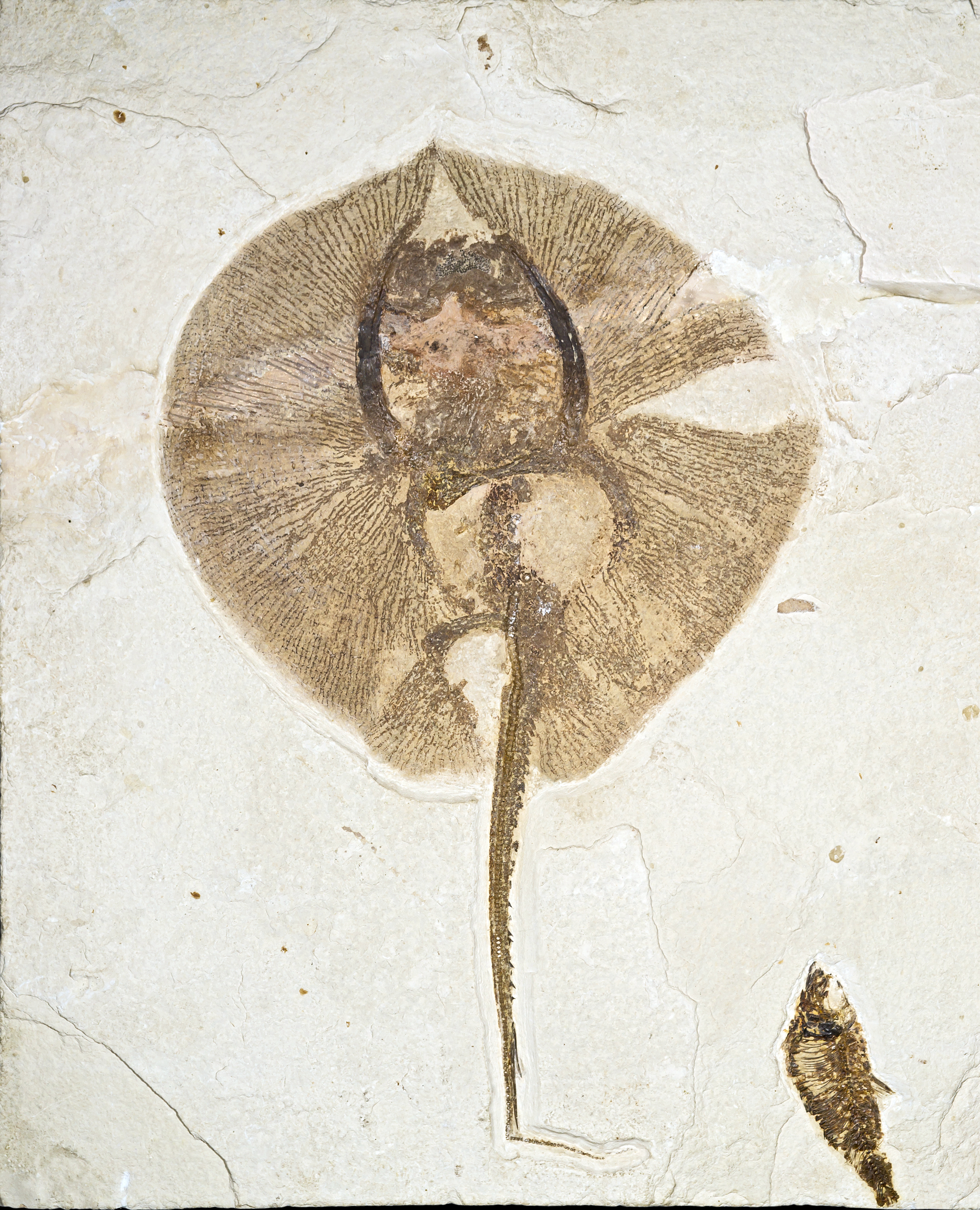
Early Eocene fossil stingray Heliobatis radians

A diversity of stingray fossils is known from the Eocene Monte Bolca formation from Italy, including the early stingaree Arechia, as well as Dasyomyliobatis, which is thought to represent a transitional form between stingrays and eagle rays, and the highly unusual Lessiniabatis, which had an extremely short and slender tail with no sting.

== Anatomy ==
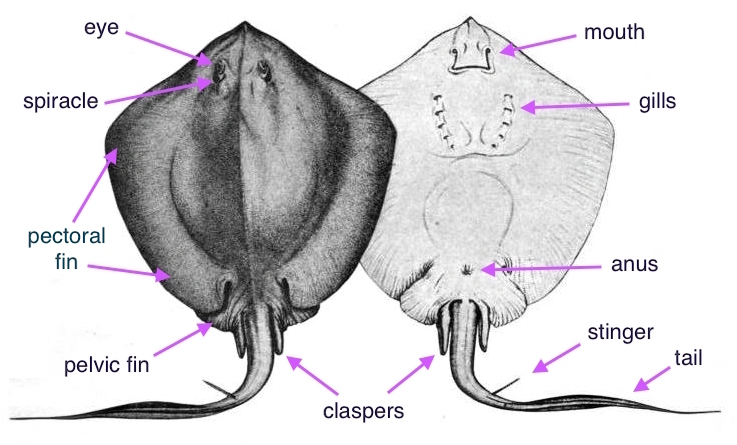
dorsal (topside) ← → ventral (underside) External anatomy of a male bluntnose stingray (Hypanus say)

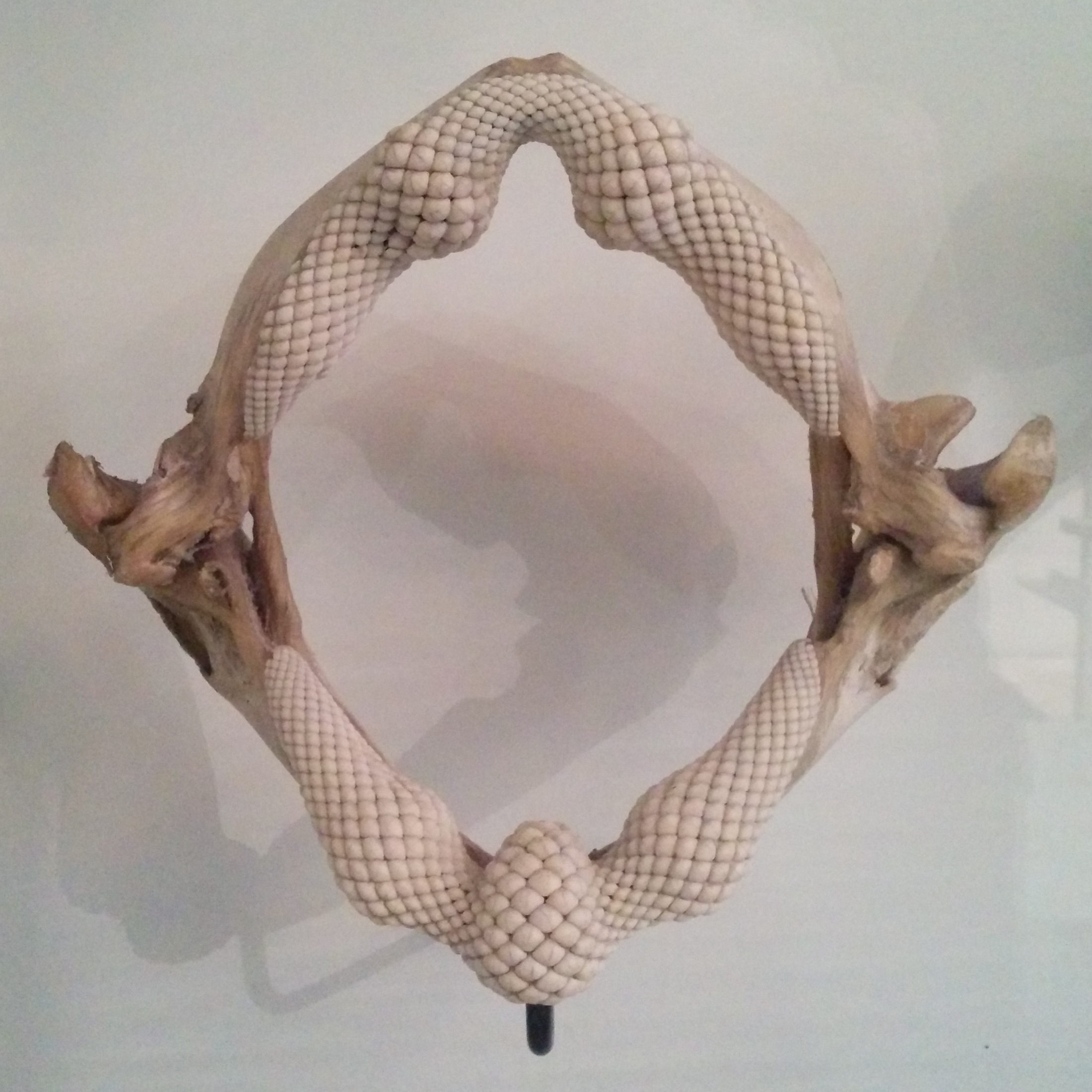
Stingray jaw and teeth.
The teeth are modified placoid scales.

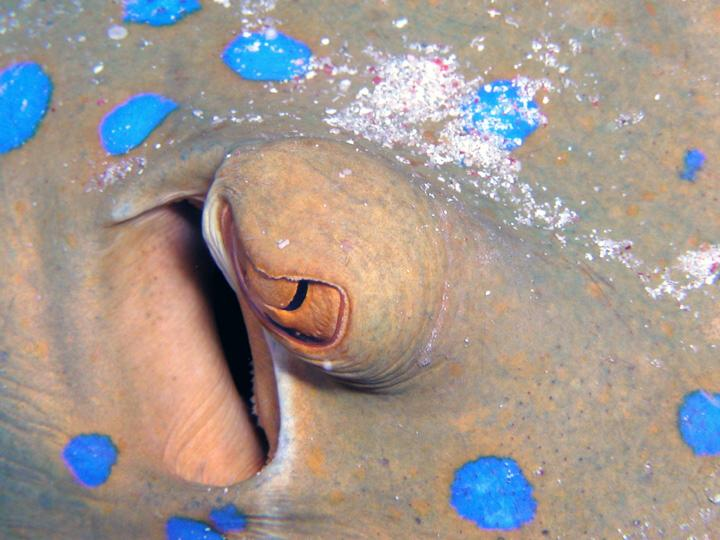
Like in other rays, the bluespotted ribbontail ray (Taeniura lymma) breathes though spiracles just behind the eyes when it hunts in seafloor sediment.

=== Jaw and teeth ===
The mouth of the stingray is located on the ventral side of the vertebrate. Stingrays exhibit hyostylic jaw suspension, which means that the mandibular arch is only suspended by an articulation with the hyomandibula. This type of suspensions allows for the upper jaw to have high mobility and protrude outward. The teeth are modified placoid scales that are regularly shed and replaced. In general, the teeth have a root implanted within the connective tissue and a visible portion of the tooth, is large and flat, allowing them to crush the bodies of hard shelled prey. Male stingrays display sexual dimorphism by developing cusps, or pointed ends, to some of their teeth. During mating season, some stingray species fully change their tooth morphology which then returns to baseline during non-mating seasons.

=== Spiracles ===
Spiracles are small openings that allow some fish and amphibians to breathe. Stingray spiracles are openings just behind its eyes. The respiratory system of stingrays is complicated by having two separate ways to take in water to use the oxygen. Most of the time stingrays take in water using their mouth and then send the water through the gills for gas exchange. This is efficient, but the mouth cannot be used when hunting because the stingrays bury themselves in the ocean sediment and wait for prey to swim by. So the stingray switches to using its spiracles. With the spiracles, they can draw water free from sediment directly into their gills for gas exchange. These alternate ventilation organs are less efficient than the mouth, since spiracles are unable to pull the same volume of water. However, it is enough when the stingray is quietly waiting to ambush its prey.

The flattened bodies of stingrays allow them to effectively conceal themselves in their environments. Stingrays do this by agitating the sand and hiding beneath it. Because their eyes are on top of their bodies and their mouths on the undersides, stingrays cannot see their prey after capture; instead, they use smell and electroreceptors (ampullae of Lorenzini) similar to those of sharks. Stingrays settle on the bottom while feeding, often leaving only their eyes and tails visible. Coral reefs are favorite feeding grounds and are usually shared with sharks during high tide.

== Behavior ==
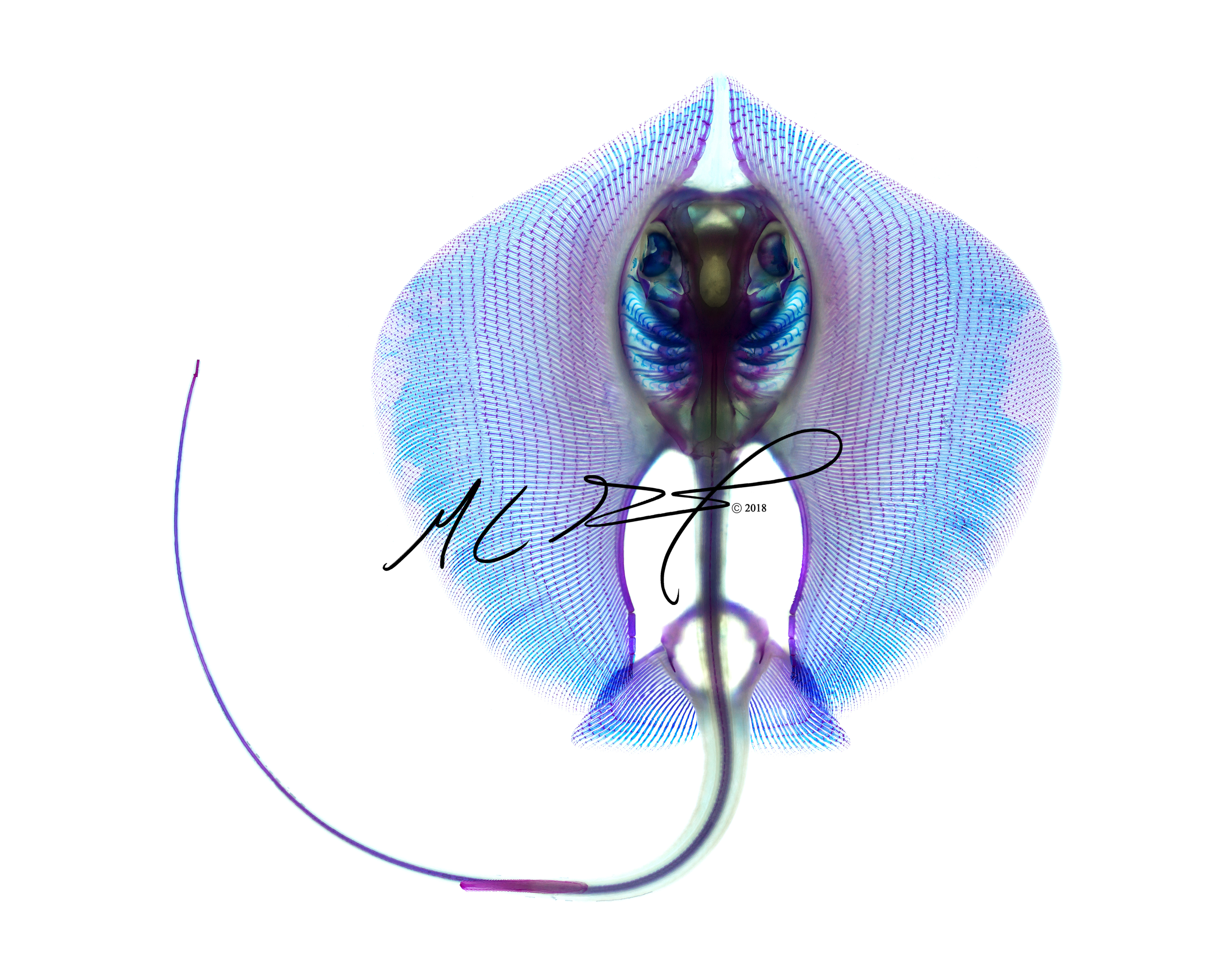
Skeleton of an atlantic stingray (Hypanus sabinus)

=== Reproduction ===
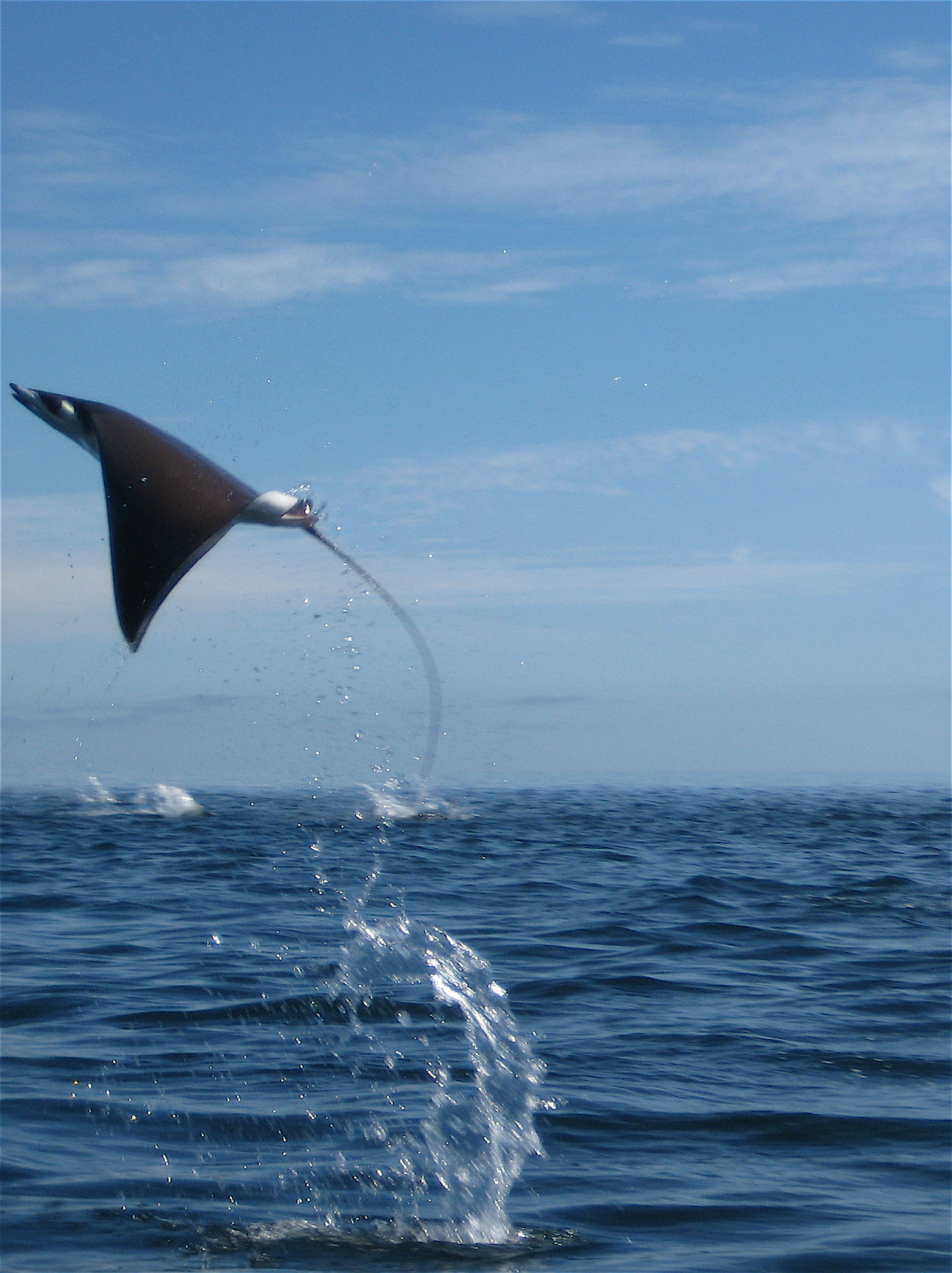
Mobula (devil rays) are thought to breach as a form of courtship.

During the breeding season, males of various stingray species, such as the round stingray (Urobatis halleri), may rely on their ampullae of Lorenzini to sense certain electrical signals given off by mature females before potential copulation. When a male is courting a female, he follows her closely, biting at her pectoral disc. He then places one of his two claspers into her valve.

Reproductive ray behaviors are associated with their behavioral endocrinology, for example, in species such as the atlantic stingray (Hypanus sabinus), social groups are formed first, then the sexes display complex courtship behaviors that end in pair copulation which is similar to the species Urobatis halleri. Furthermore, their mating period is one of the longest recorded in elasmobranch fish. Individuals are known to mate for seven months before the females ovulate in March. During this time, the male stingrays experience increased levels of androgen hormones which has been linked to its prolonged mating periods. The behavior expressed among males and females during specific parts of this period involves aggressive social interactions. Frequently, the males trail females with their snout near the female vent then proceed to bite the female on her fins and her body. Although this mating behavior is similar to the species Urobatis halleri, differences can be seen in the particular actions of Hypanus sabinus. Seasonal elevated levels of serum androgens coincide with the expressed aggressive behavior, which led to the proposal that androgen steroids start, indorse and maintain aggressive sexual behaviors in the male rays for this species which drives the prolonged mating season. Similarly, concise elevations of serum androgens in females has been connected to increased aggression and improvement in mate choice. When their androgen steroid levels are elevated, they are able to improve their mate choice by quickly fleeing from tenacious males when undergoing ovulation succeeding impregnation. This ability affects the paternity of their offspring by refusing less qualified mates.

Stingrays are ovoviviparous, bearing live young in "litters" of five to thirteen. During this period, the female's behavior transitions to support of her future offspring. Females hold the embryos in the womb without a placenta. Instead, the embryos absorb nutrients from a yolk sac and after the sac is depleted, the mother provides uterine "milk". After birth, the offspring generally disassociate from the mother and swim away, having been born with the instinctual abilities to protect and feed themselves. In a small number of species, like the giant freshwater stingray (Urogymnus polylepis), the mother "cares" for her young by having them swim with her until they are one-third of her size.

At the Sea Life London Aquarium, two female stingrays delivered seven baby stingrays, although the mothers have not been near a male for two years. This suggests some species of rays can store sperm then give birth when they deem conditions to be suitable.

=== Locomotion ===
Atlantic stingray (Hypanus sabinus) undulation locomotion

The stingray uses its paired pectoral fins for moving around. This is in contrast to sharks and most other fish, which get most of their swimming power from a single caudal (tail) fin. Stingray pectoral fin locomotion can be divided into two categories, undulatory and oscillatory. Stingrays that use undulatory locomotion have shorter thicker fins for slower motile movements in benthic areas. Longer thinner pectoral fins make for faster speeds in oscillation mobility in pelagic zones. Visually distinguishable oscillation has less than one wave going, opposed to undulation having more than one wave at all times.

=== Feeding behavior and diet ===
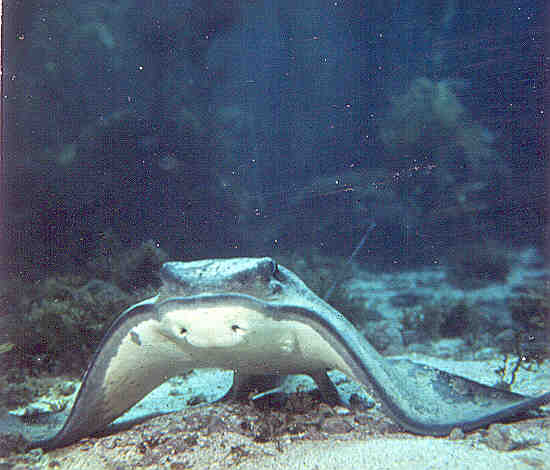
Bat ray (Myliobatis californica) in a feeding posture

Stingrays use a wide range of feeding strategies. Some have specialized jaws that allow them to crush hard mollusk shells, whereas others use external mouth structures called cephalic lobes to guide plankton into their oral cavity. Benthic stingrays (those that reside on the sea floor) are ambush hunters. They wait until prey comes near, then use a strategy called "tenting". With pectoral fins pressed against the substrate, the ray raises its head, generating a suction force that pulls the prey underneath the body. This form of whole-body suction is analogous to the buccal suction feeding performed by ray-finned fish. Stingrays exhibit a wide range of colors and patterns on their dorsal surface to help them camouflage with the sandy bottom. Some stingrays can even change color over the course of several days to adjust to new habitats. Since their mouths are on the underside of their bodies, they catch their prey, then crush and eat with their powerful jaws. Like its shark relatives, the stingray is outfitted with electrical sensors called ampullae of Lorenzini. Located around the stingray's mouth, these organs sense the natural electrical charges of potential prey. Many rays have jaw teeth to enable them to crush mollusks such as clams, oysters and mussels.

Most stingrays feed primarily on mollusks, crustaceans and, occasionally, on small fish. Freshwater stingrays in the Amazon feed on insects and break down their tough exoskeletons with mammal-like chewing motions. Large pelagic rays like the manta use ram feeding to consume vast quantities of plankton and have been seen swimming in acrobatic patterns through plankton patches.

== Stingray injuries ==
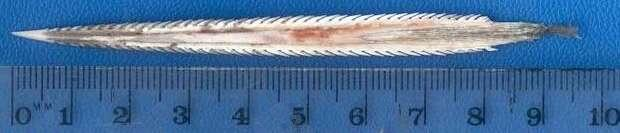
The stinger of a stingray is known also as the spinal blade. It is located in the mid-area of the tail and can secrete venom. The ruler measures 10 cm (3.9 in).

Stingrays are not usually aggressive and ordinarily attack humans only when provoked, such as when they are accidentally stepped on. Stingrays can have one, two or three blades. Contact with the spinal blade or blades causes local trauma (from the cut itself), pain, swelling, muscle cramps from the venom and, later, may result in infection from bacteria or fungi. The injury is quite painful, but rarely life-threatening unless the stinger pierces a vital area. The blade is often deeply barbed and usually breaks off in the wound. Surgery may be required to remove the fragments.

Fatal stings are rare. The death of Steve Irwin in 2006 was only the second recorded in Australian waters since 1945. The stinger penetrated his thoracic wall and pierced his heart, causing massive trauma and bleeding.

=== Venom ===
Posterior anatomy of a stingray. (1) Pelvic fins (2) Caudal tubercles (3) Stinger (4) Dorsal fin (5) Claspers (6) Tail

The venom of the stingray has been relatively unstudied due to the mixture of venomous tissue secretions cells and mucous membrane cell products that occurs upon secretion from the spinal blade. The spine is covered with the epidermal skin layer. During secretion, the venom penetrates the epidermis and mixes with the mucus to release the venom on its victim. Typically, other venomous organisms create and store their venom in a gland. The stingray is notable in that it stores its venom within tissue cells. The toxins that have been confirmed to be within the venom are cystatins, peroxiredoxin and galectin. Galectin induces cell death in its victims and cystatins inhibit defense enzymes. In humans, these toxins lead to increased blood flow in the superficial capillaries and cell death. Despite the number of cells and toxins that are within the stingray, there is little relative energy required to produce and store the venom.

The venom is produced and stored in the secretory cells of the vertebral column at the mid-distal region. These secretory cells are housed within the ventrolateral grooves of the spine. The cells of both marine and freshwater stingrays are round and contain a great amount of granule-filled cytoplasm. The stinging cells of marine stingrays are located only within these lateral grooves of the stinger. The stinging cells of freshwater stingray branch out beyond the lateral grooves to cover a larger surface area along the entire blade. Due to this large area and an increased number of proteins within the cells, the venom of freshwater stingrays has a greater toxicity than that of marine stingrays.

== Human use ==
=== As food ===
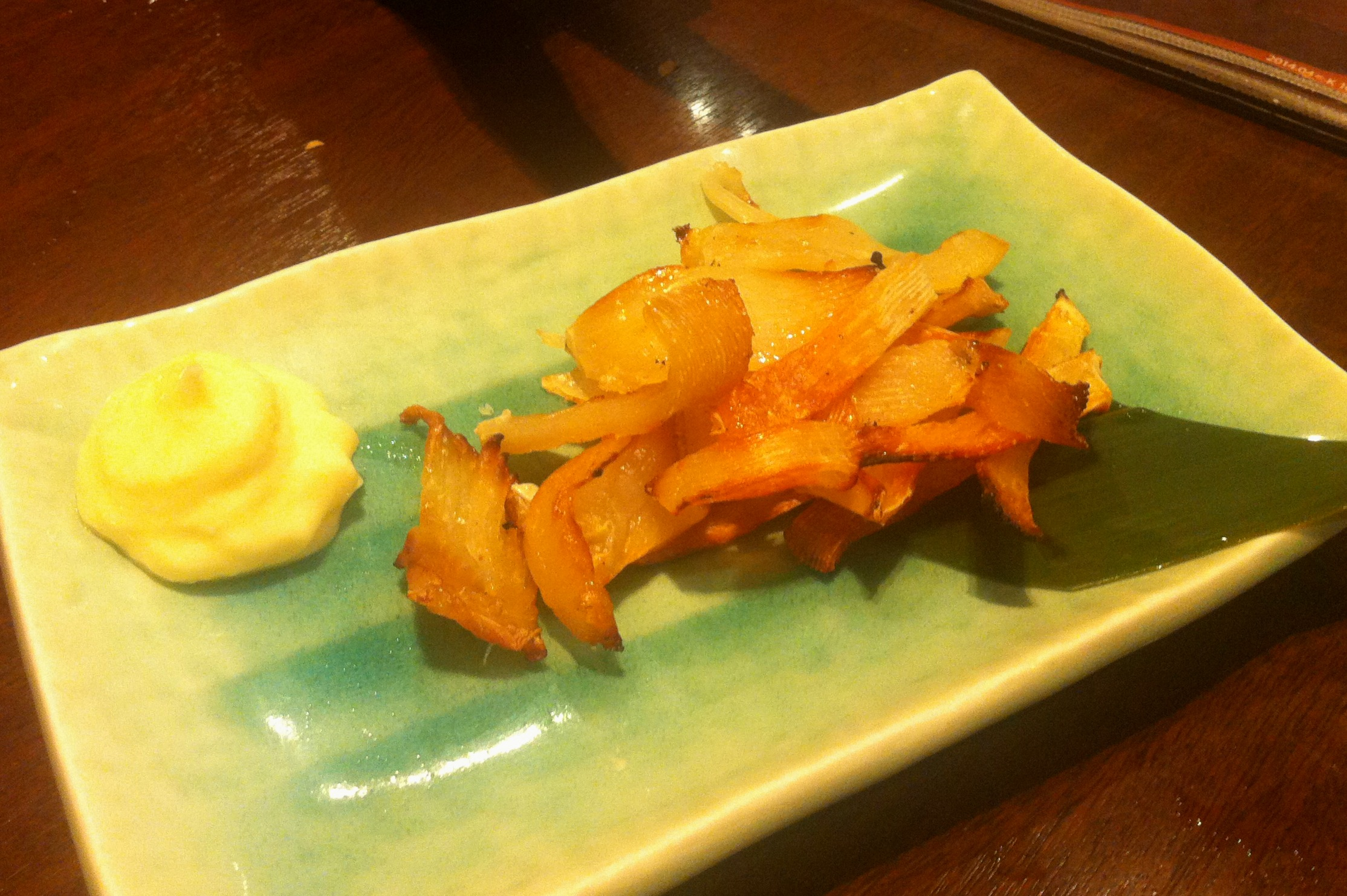
Eihire, dried strips of stingray fin, served as a drinking snack in Japan

Rays are edible, and may be caught as food using fishing lines or spears. Stingray recipes can be found in many coastal areas worldwide. For example, in Malaysia and Singapore, stingray is commonly grilled over charcoal, then served with spicy sambal sauce. In Goa, and other Indian states, it is sometimes used as part of spicy curries.

Generally, the most prized parts of the stingray are the wings, the "cheek" (the area surrounding the eyes), and the liver. The rest of the ray is considered too rubbery to have any culinary uses.

The optimal size edible stingray has a wingspan of about 18 inches to 2 feet (45-65 centimeters). They may be prepared as a "mock scallop" or fillet in a dish, or smaller cuts. They are caught by fishermen in coastal US states, and usually thrown back, but sometimes eaten or saved for preservation and display. Florida and other states have originated some regional preparations. Since the taste is similar to or better than scallops (including skates and similar rays), Aile de Raie à la Bretonne is prepared in France. There are also various other dishes from countries including Iceland and Britain.

=== Ecotourism ===
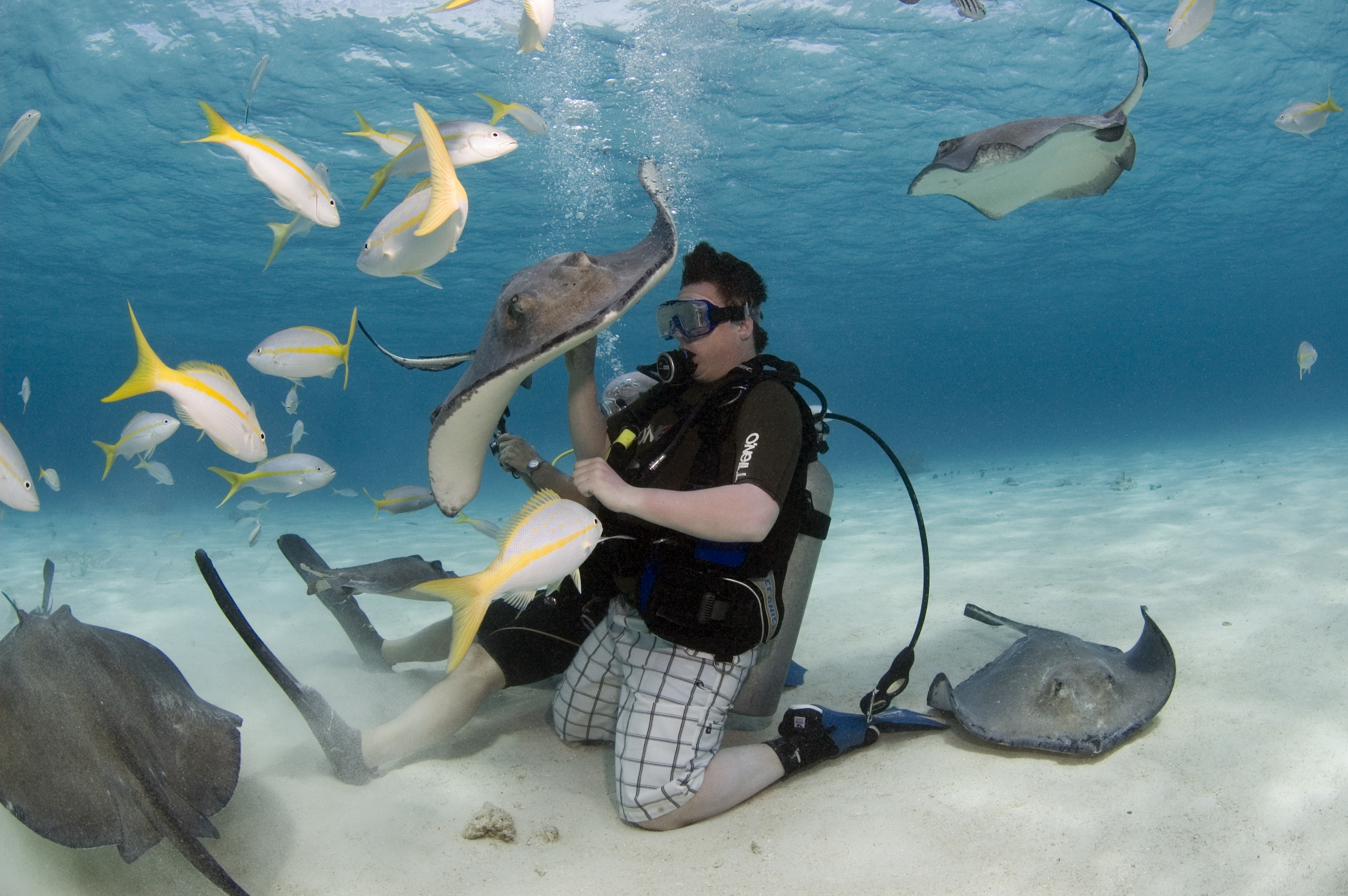
Divers can interact with southern stingrays (Hypanus americanus) at Stingray City in the Cayman Islands.

Stingrays are usually docile and curious, their usual reaction being to flee any disturbance, but they sometimes brush their fins past any new object they encounter. Nevertheless, certain larger species may be more aggressive and should be approached with caution, as the stingray's defensive reflex (use of its venomous stinger) may result in serious injury or death.

=== Other uses ===
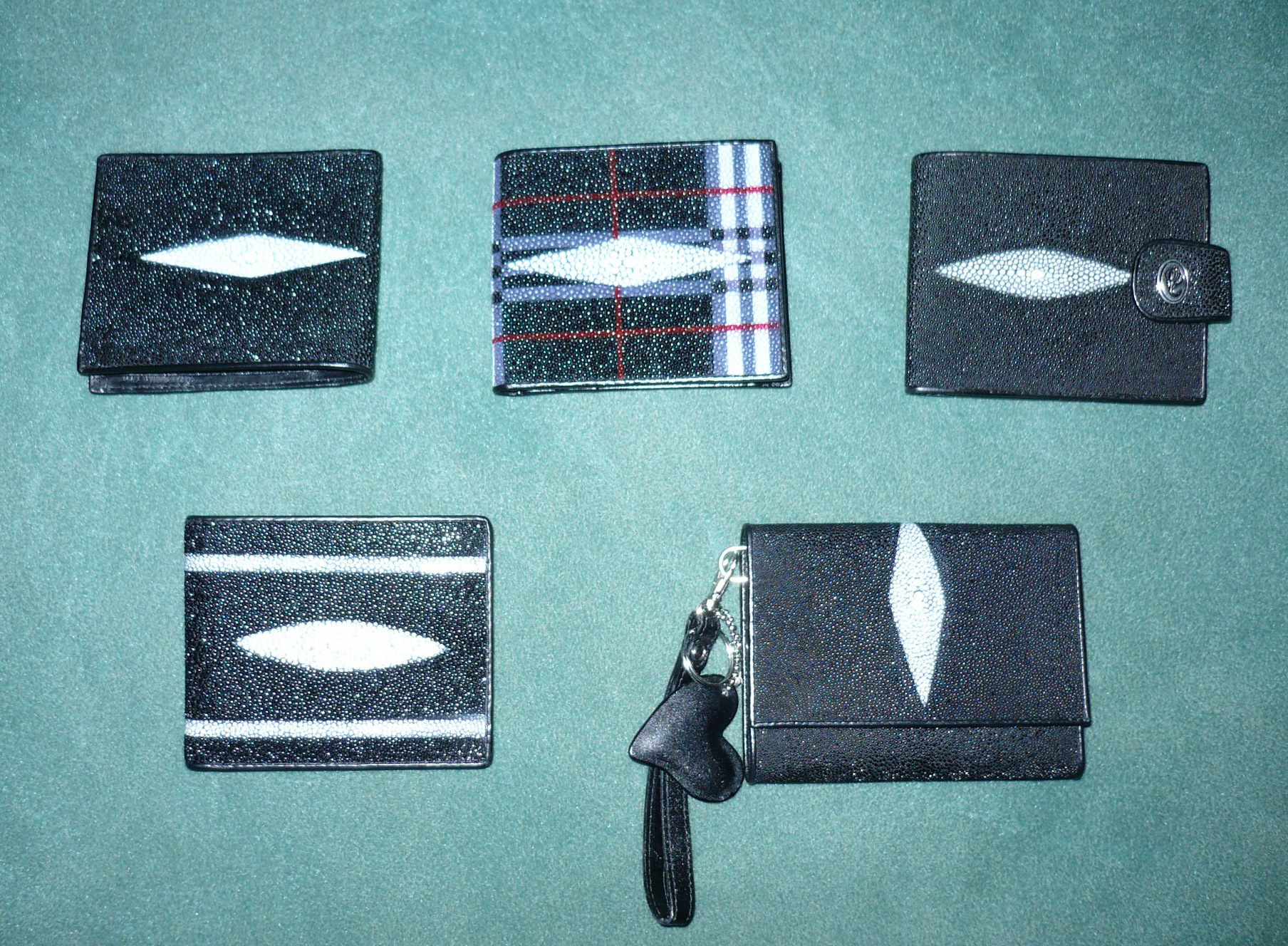
Stingray wallets

The skin of the ray is used as an under layer for the cord or leather wrap (known as samegawa in Japanese) on Japanese swords due to its hard, rough texture that keeps the braided wrap from sliding on the handle during use.

Several ethnological sections in museums, such as the British Museum, display arrowheads and spearheads made of stingray stingers, used in Micronesia and elsewhere. Henry de Monfreid stated in his books that before World War II, in the Horn of Africa, whips were made from the tails of big stingrays and these devices inflicted cruel cuts, so in Aden, the British forbade their use on women and slaves. In former Spanish colonies, a stingray is called raya látigo ("whip ray").

Some stingray species are commonly seen in public aquarium exhibits and more recently in home aquaria.

== Gallery ==
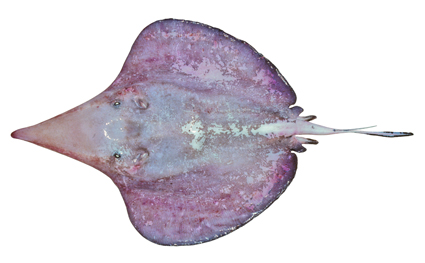
Unlike other rays, sixgill stingrays (Hexatrygon bickelli) have six rather than five pairs of gill slits.

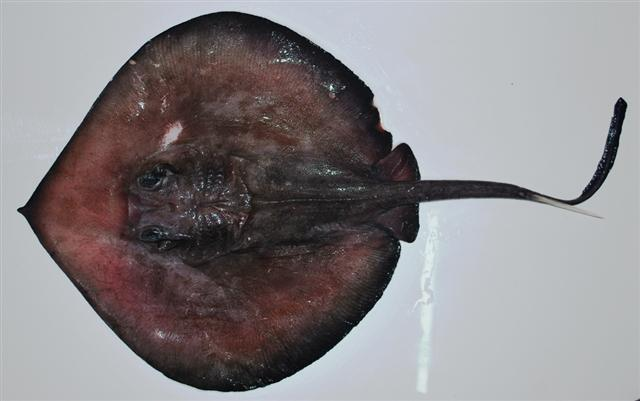
Deepwater stingrays (Plesiobatis daviesi) are found on the upper continental slope throughout the Indo-Pacific.

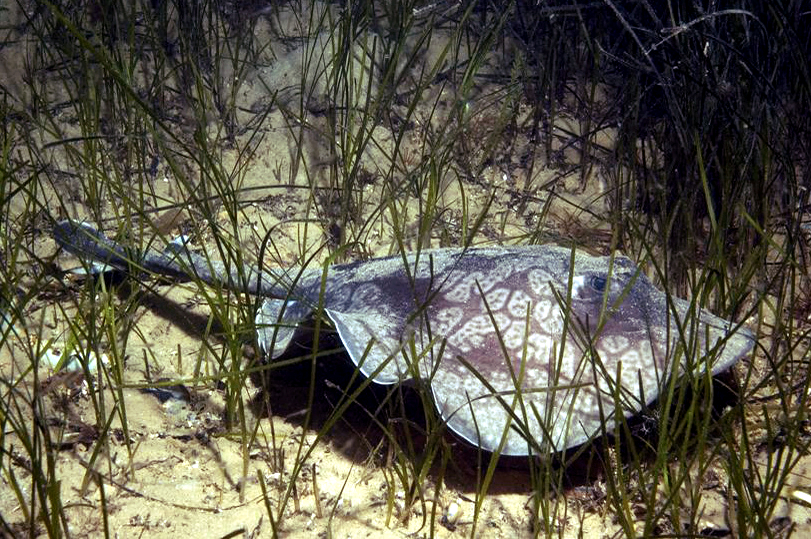
Spotted stingarees (Urolophus gigas) are found along the Western Australian coast.

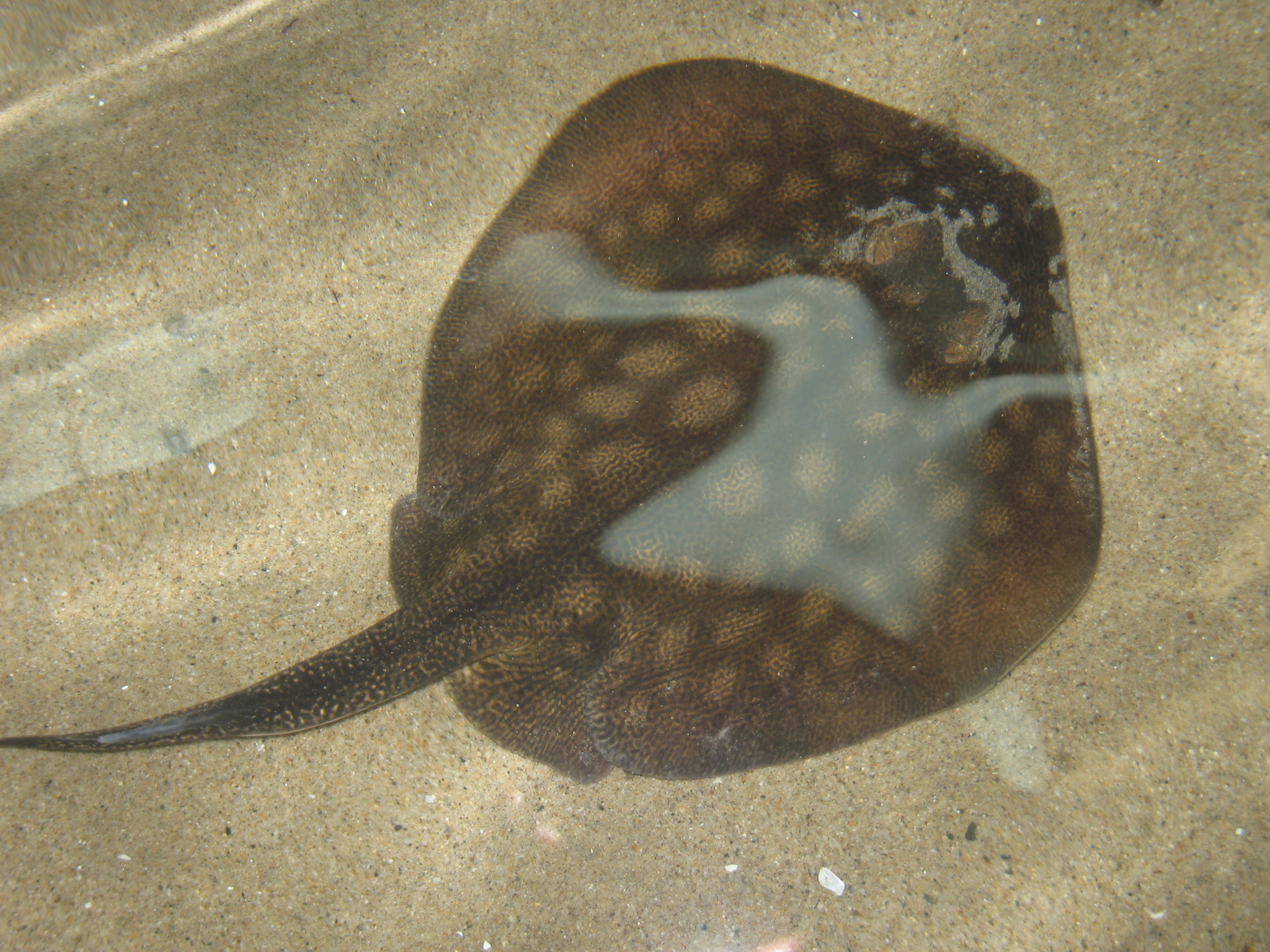
Round stingrays (Urobatis halleri) frequently sting beachgoers along the Western American coast.

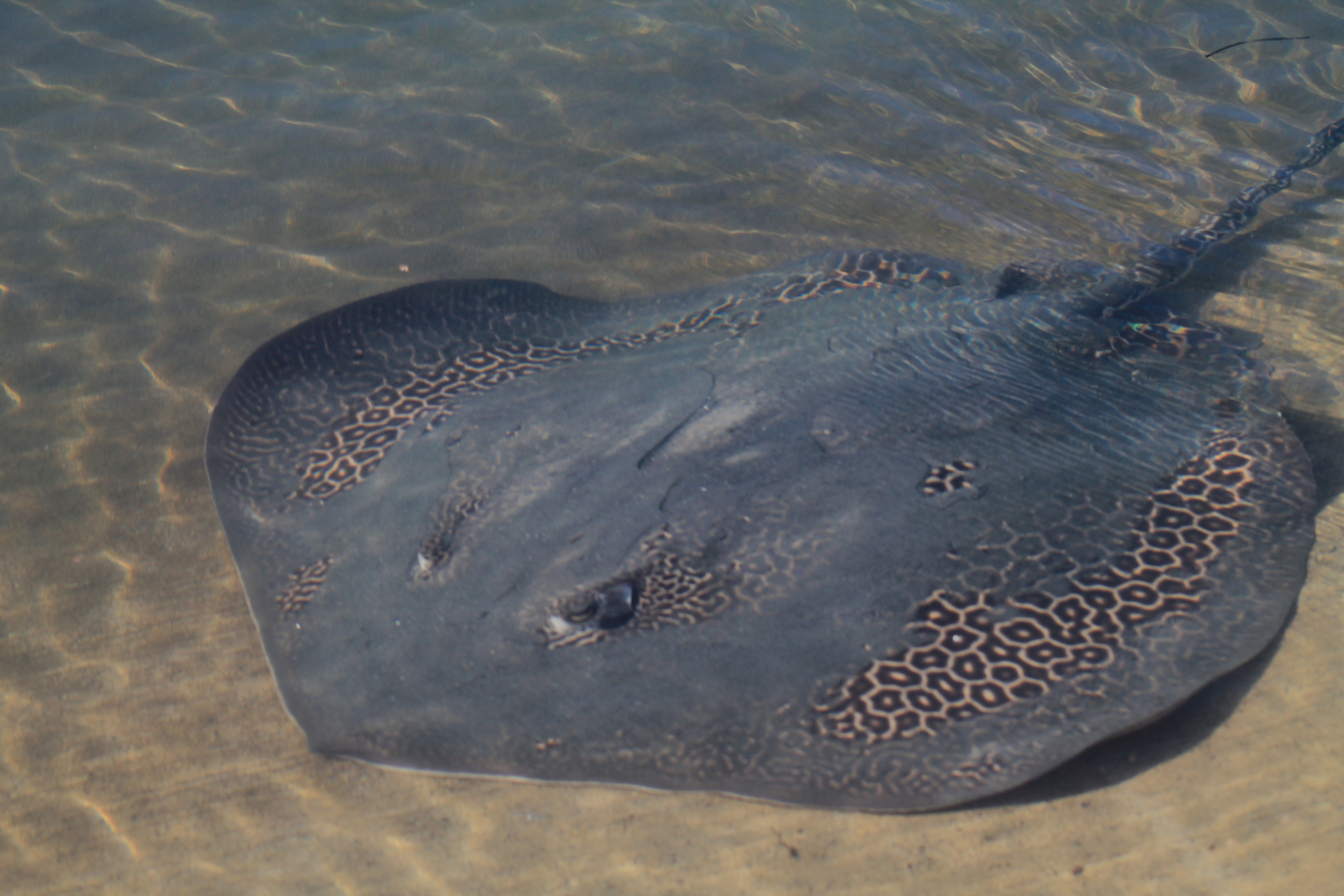
Leopard whiprays (Himantura leoparda) are vulnerable from overfishing.

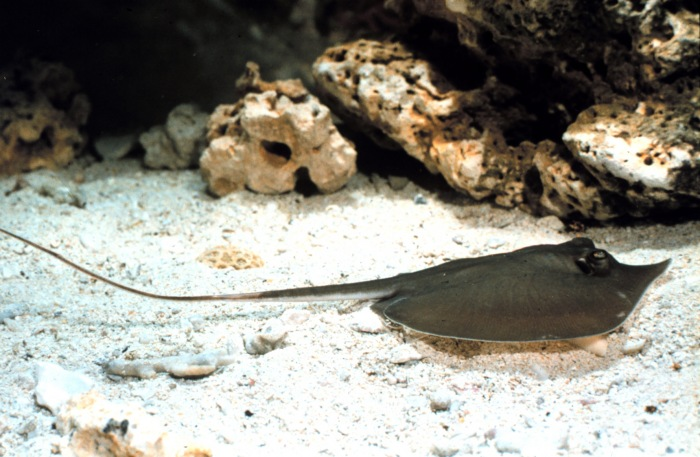
Atlantic stingrays (Hypanus sabinus) are found in marine, brackish, and freshwater environments along the Southeastern United States coast.

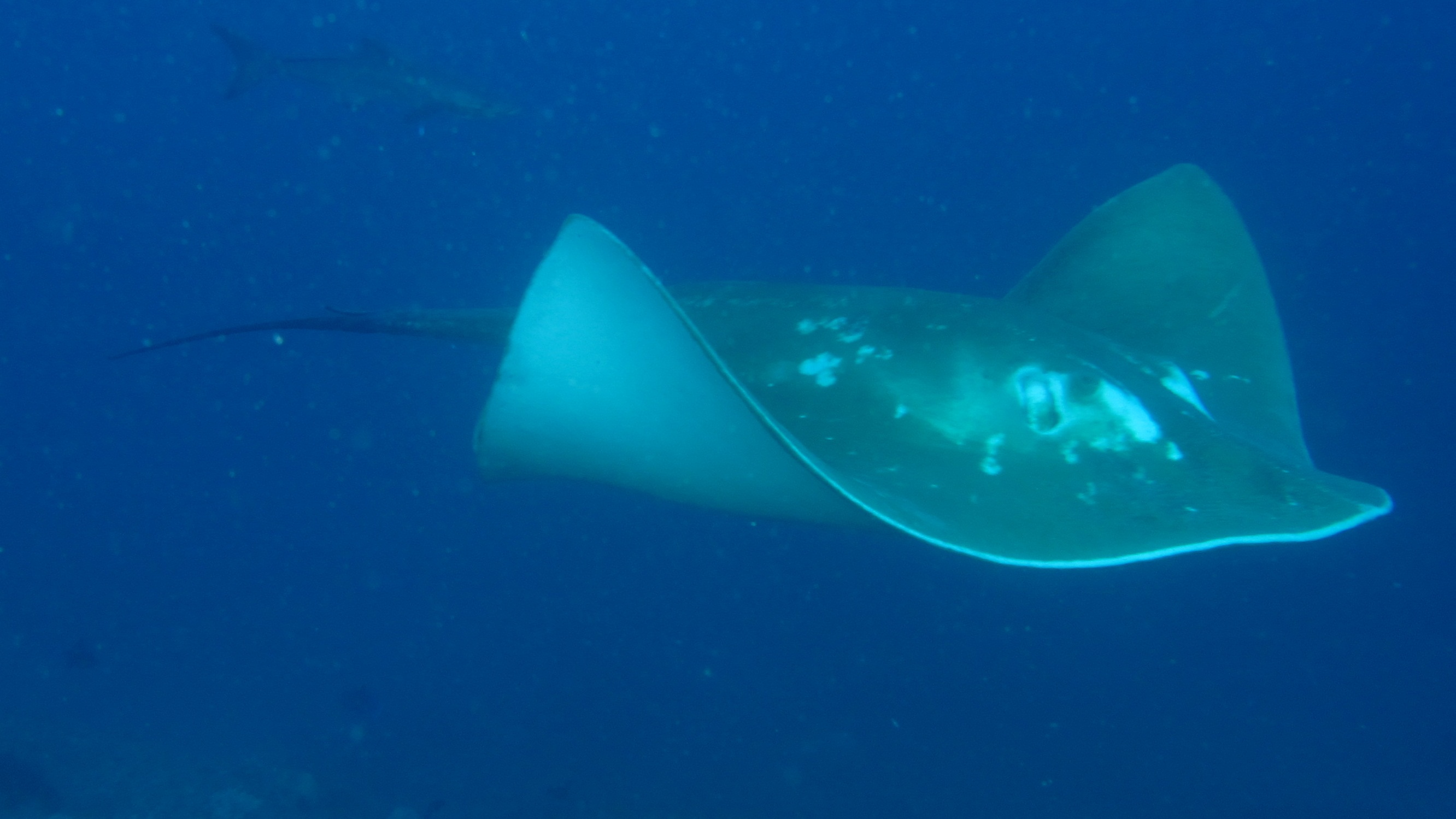
The smalleye stingray (Megatrygon microps) is a rare stingray distributed throughout the Indo-Pacific.

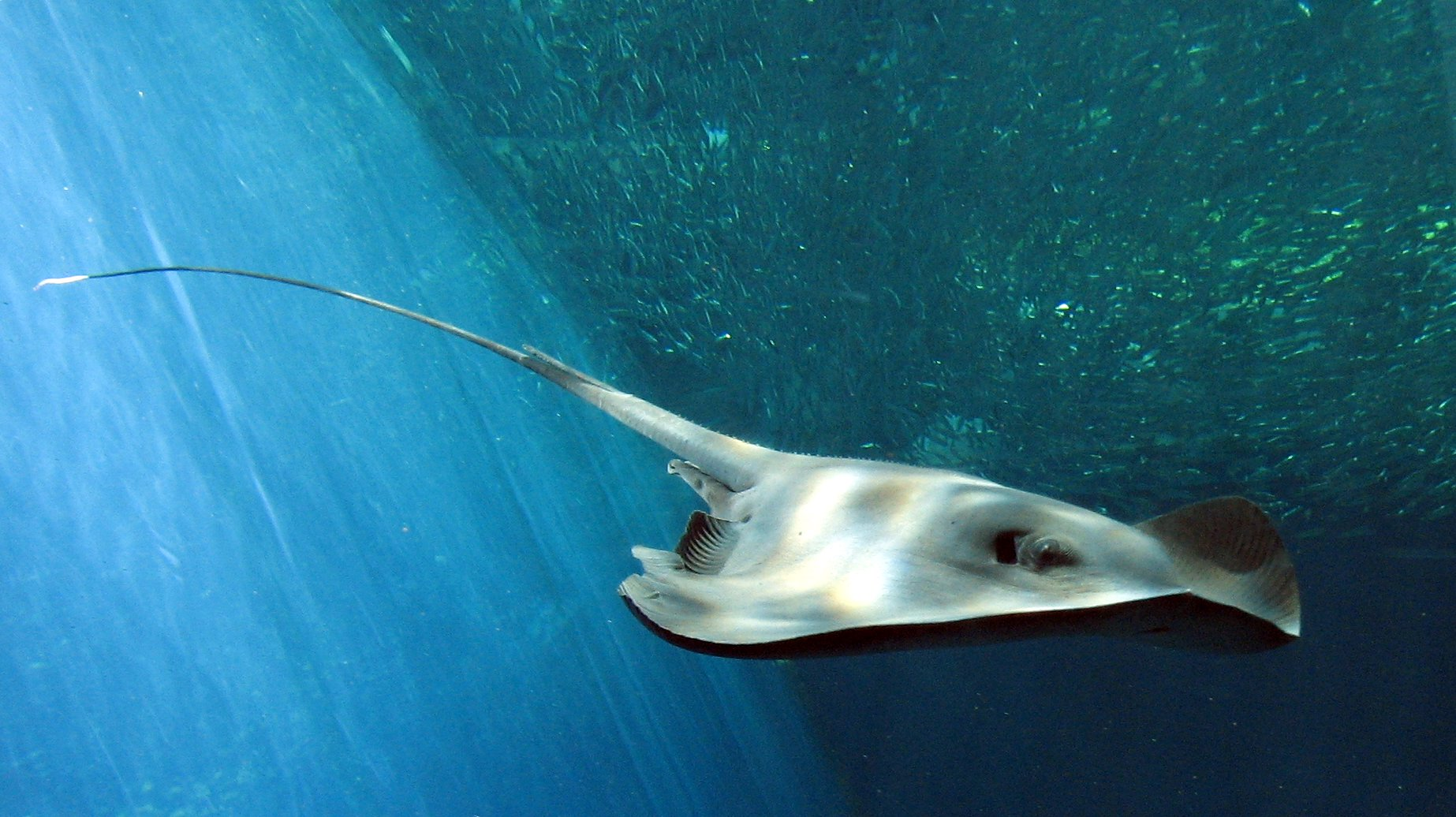
The pelagic stingray (Pteroplatytrygon violacea) is one of the few stingrays that primarily inhabit the open ocean.

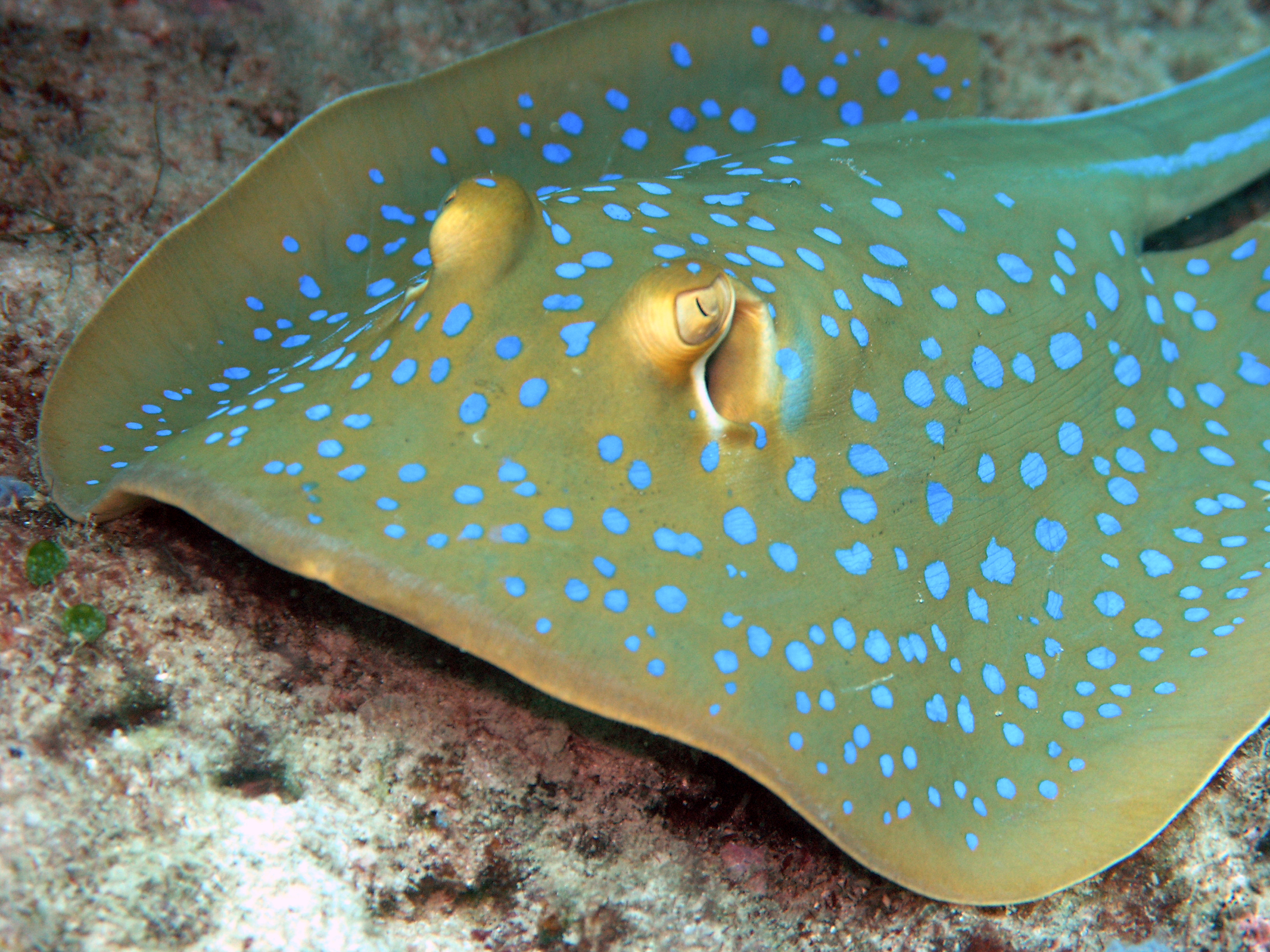
Bluespotted ribbontail rays (Taeniura lymma)

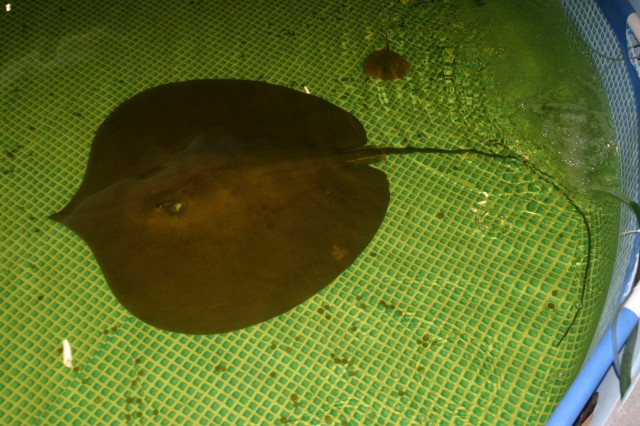
Giant freshwater stingrays (Urogymnus polylepis) are amongst the largest freshwater fish.

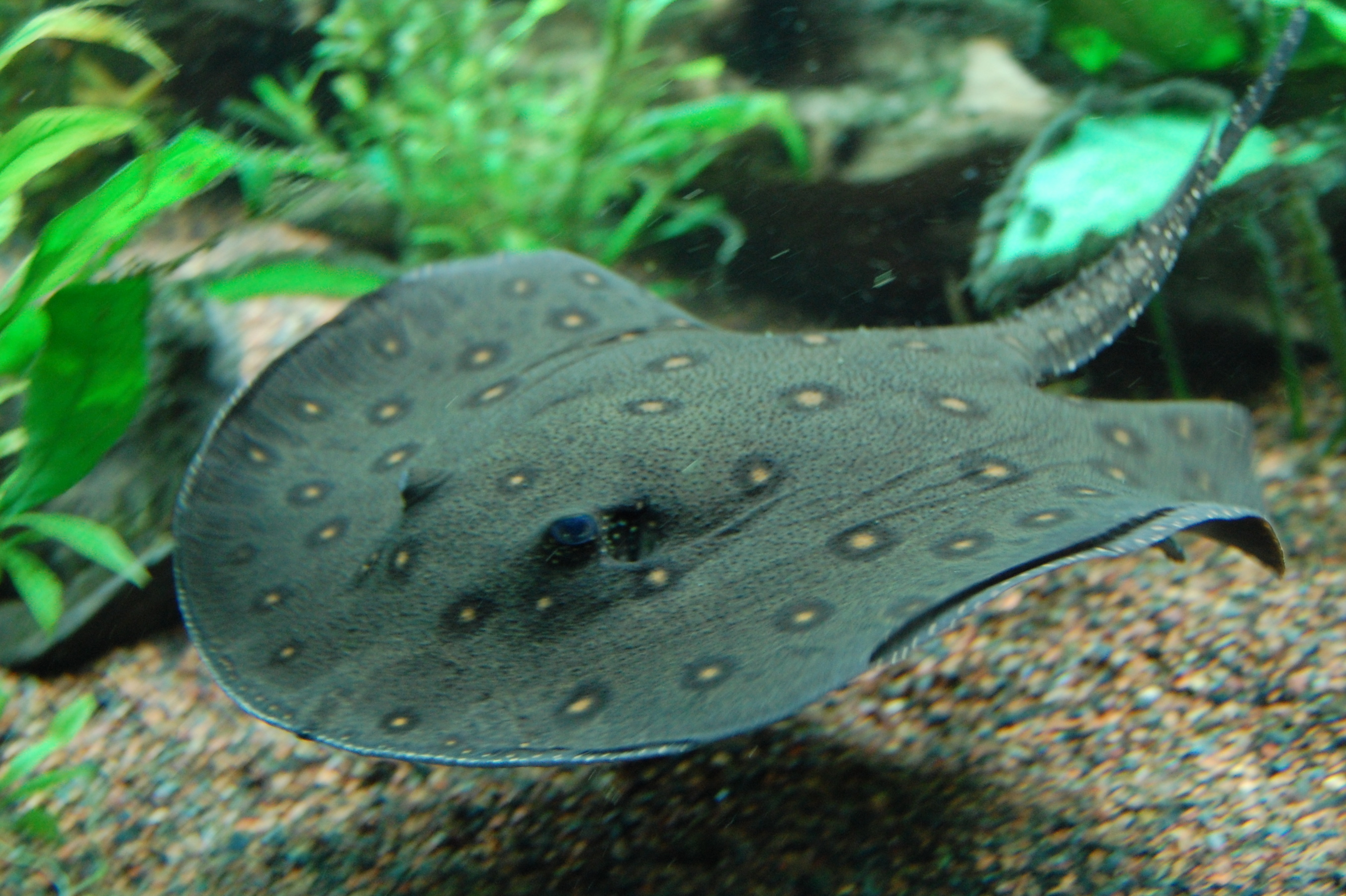
Ocellate river stingrays (Potamotrygon motoro) are found in South American rivers.

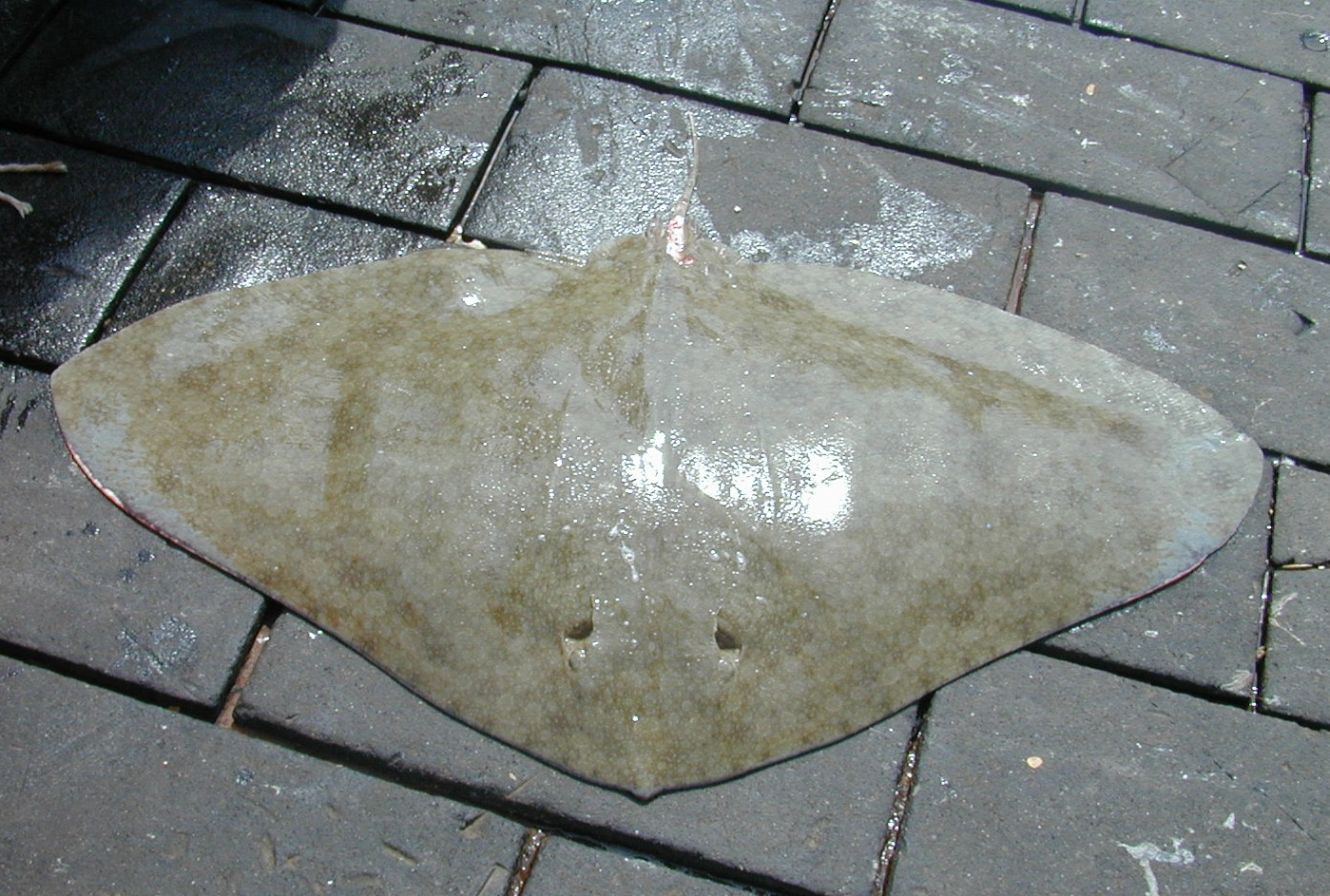
Spiny butterfly rays (Gymnura altavela) are endangered from overfishing. Found along the lower East Coast of the United States and the South American coast.

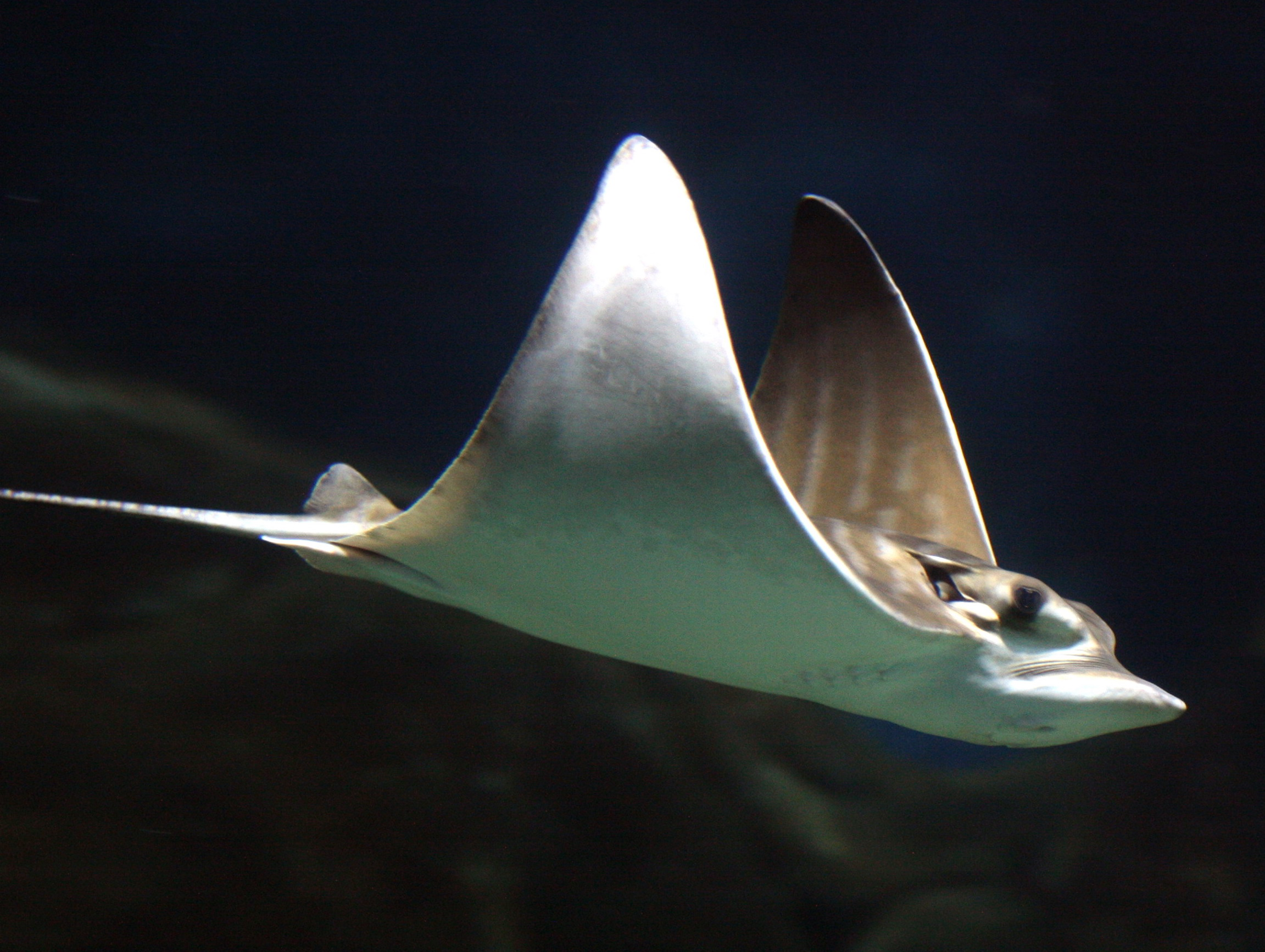
Bull rays (Aetomylaeus bovinus) are found along European and African coasts.

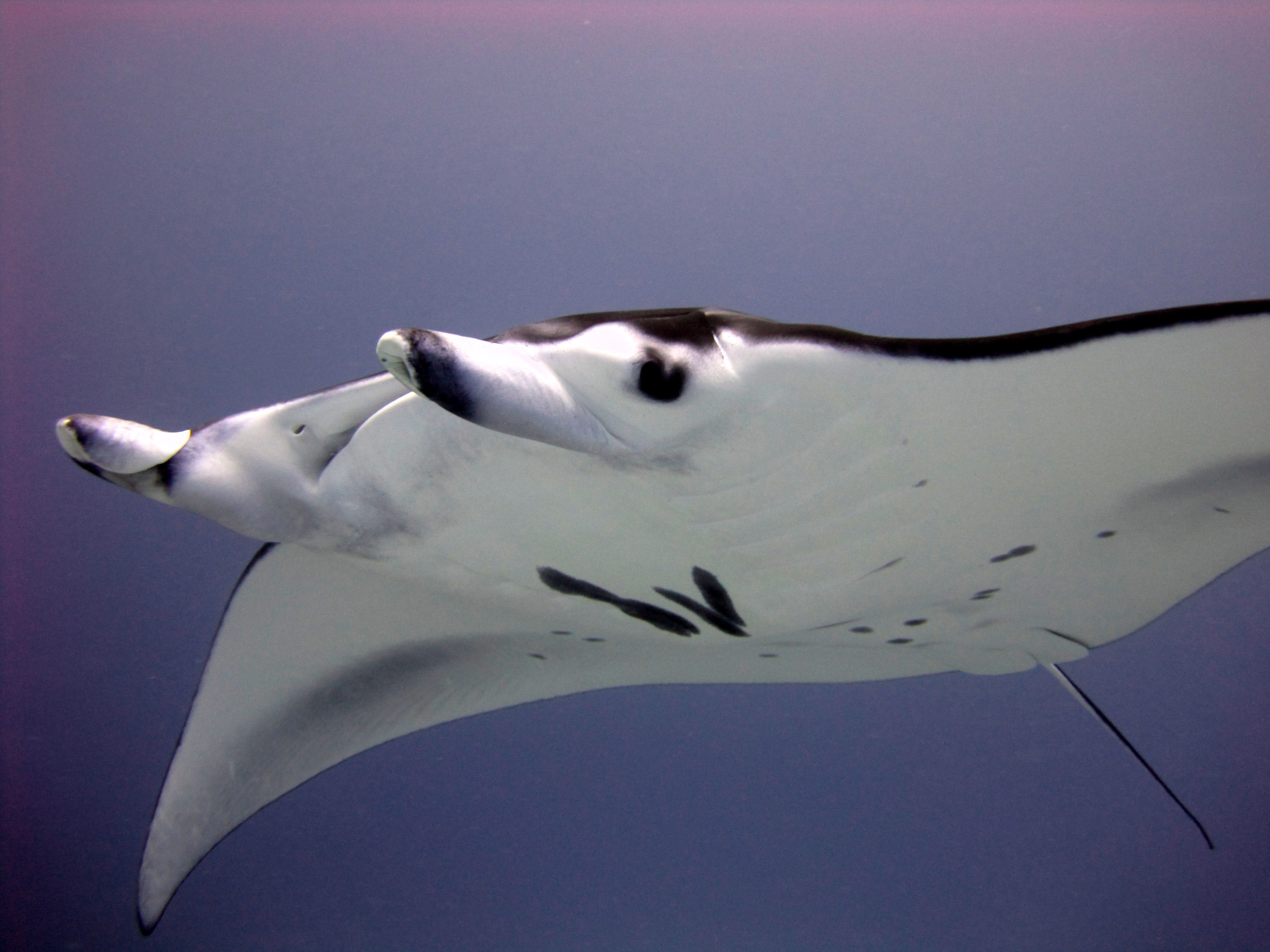
Giant oceanic manta rays (Mobula birostris) are the largest of the stingrays.

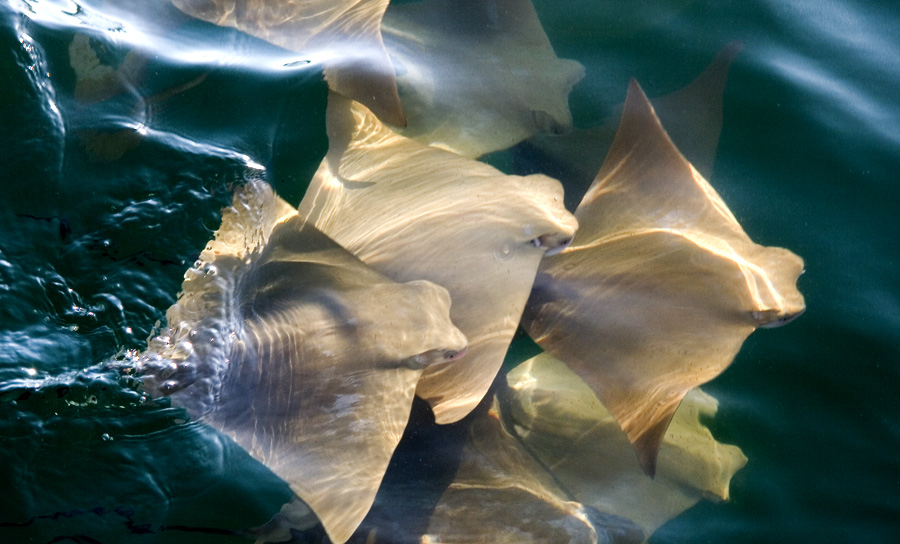
Golden cownose rays (Rhinoptera steindachneri) often migrate in large schools.

== See also ==
- List of threatened rays

== Bibliography ==
- Froese, Rainer; Pauly, Daniel (eds.). "Family Dasyatidae". FishBase. August 2005 version.
