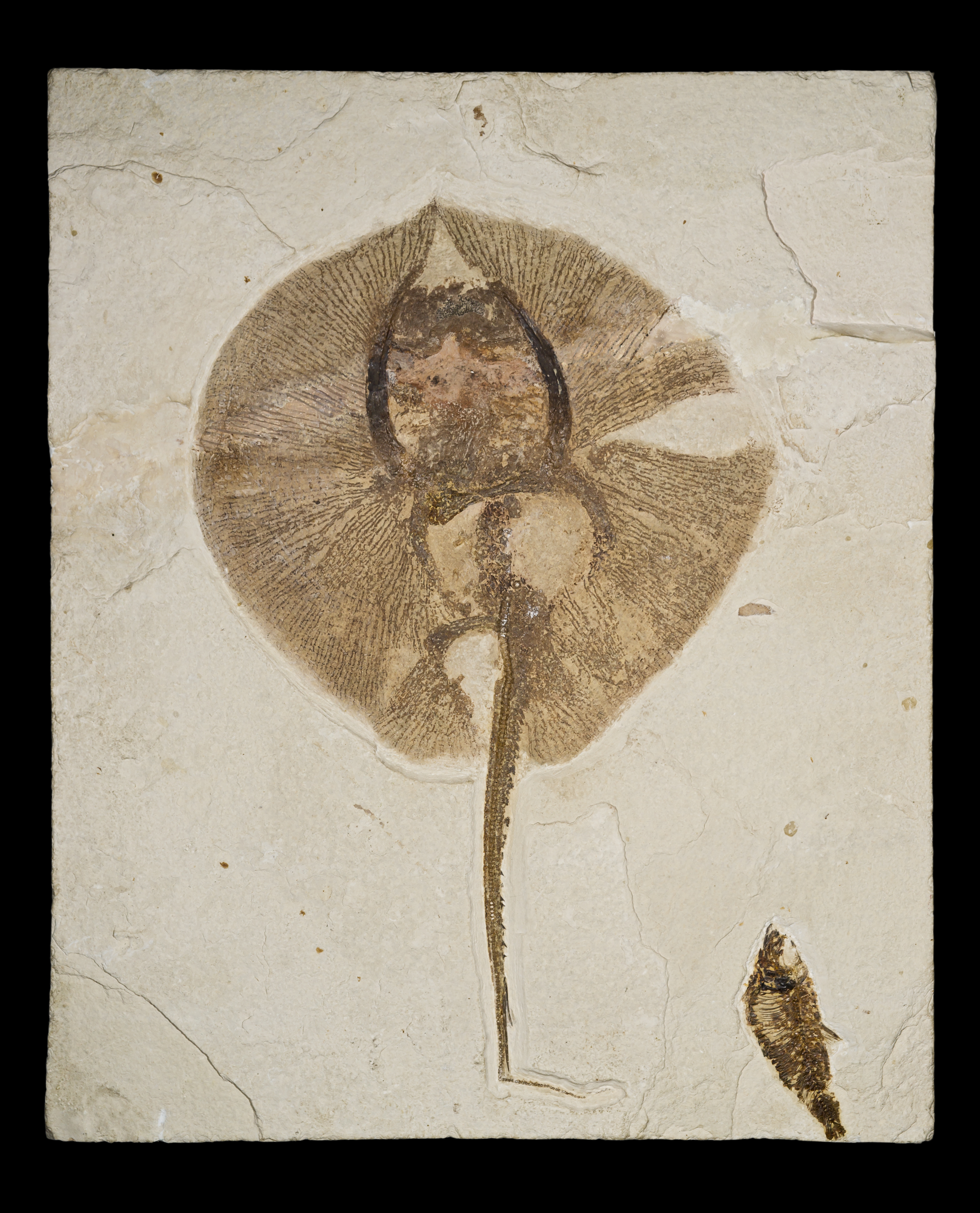
- Male Heliobatis radians fossil

Scientific classification
- Kingdom: Animalia
- Phylum: Chordata
- Class: Chondrichthyes
- Subclass: Elasmobranchii
- Order: Myliobatiformes
- Family: Dasyatidae
- Genus: †Heliobatis
- Species: †H. radians

Binomial name
- †Heliobatis radians Marsh, 1877

Synonyms
- Dasyatis species Haseman, 1912; Palaeodasybatis discus Fowler, 1947; Xiphotrygon acutidens Cope, 1879; Xyphotrygus species Romer, 1971

= Heliobatis =

Heliobatis Temporal range: Early Eocene

Extinct genus of cartilaginous fishes

Heliobatis is an extinct genus of stingray in the Myliobatiformes family Dasyatidae. At present the genus contains the single species Heliobatis radians.

The genus is known primarily from the Early Eocene, Wasatchian stage, Fossil Lake deposits. Fossil Lake is part of the Green River Formation in southwest Wyoming. Heliobatis is one of only two known rays to have been found in the Green River formation; the other species, Asterotrygon maloneyi, was only recognized and described in 2004.

== History and classification ==
The genus was described from a single incomplete holotype specimen, number YPM 528, currently residing in the collections of the Peabody Museum of Natural History, New Haven, Connecticut, USA. The specimen was collected from an outcrop of Fossil Lake and presents a dorsal view of the fish. It was first studied by prolific American paleontologist Othniel Charles Marsh. He published his brief 1877 type description in the American Journal of Science. Two years later Edward Drinker Cope, rival to Marsh, published a description for a ray specimen giving it the name Xiphotrygon acutidens. Though the description by Cope is more complete and includes an illustration of his type specimen, the old name Heliobatis has seniority. In 1947 Henry Weed Fowler published a very brief description of a ray genus he dubbed Palaeodasybatis discus based on a partly restored Academy of Natural Sciences specimen, number ANSP 89344. The specimen, which was subsequently lost, was noted for having a more rounded or disc like body than Heliobatis. The genus was synonymized with Heliobatis based on illustrations of Fowler's type specimen, characterizing the more rounded appearance as an artifact of the incomplete nature of Marsh's holotype.

The generic epithet Heliobatis is a derivation of the words helios meaning "the sun" and batis, meaning "skate" or "ray." The derivation of the specific epithet radians is not mentioned in Marsh's description.

== Description ==
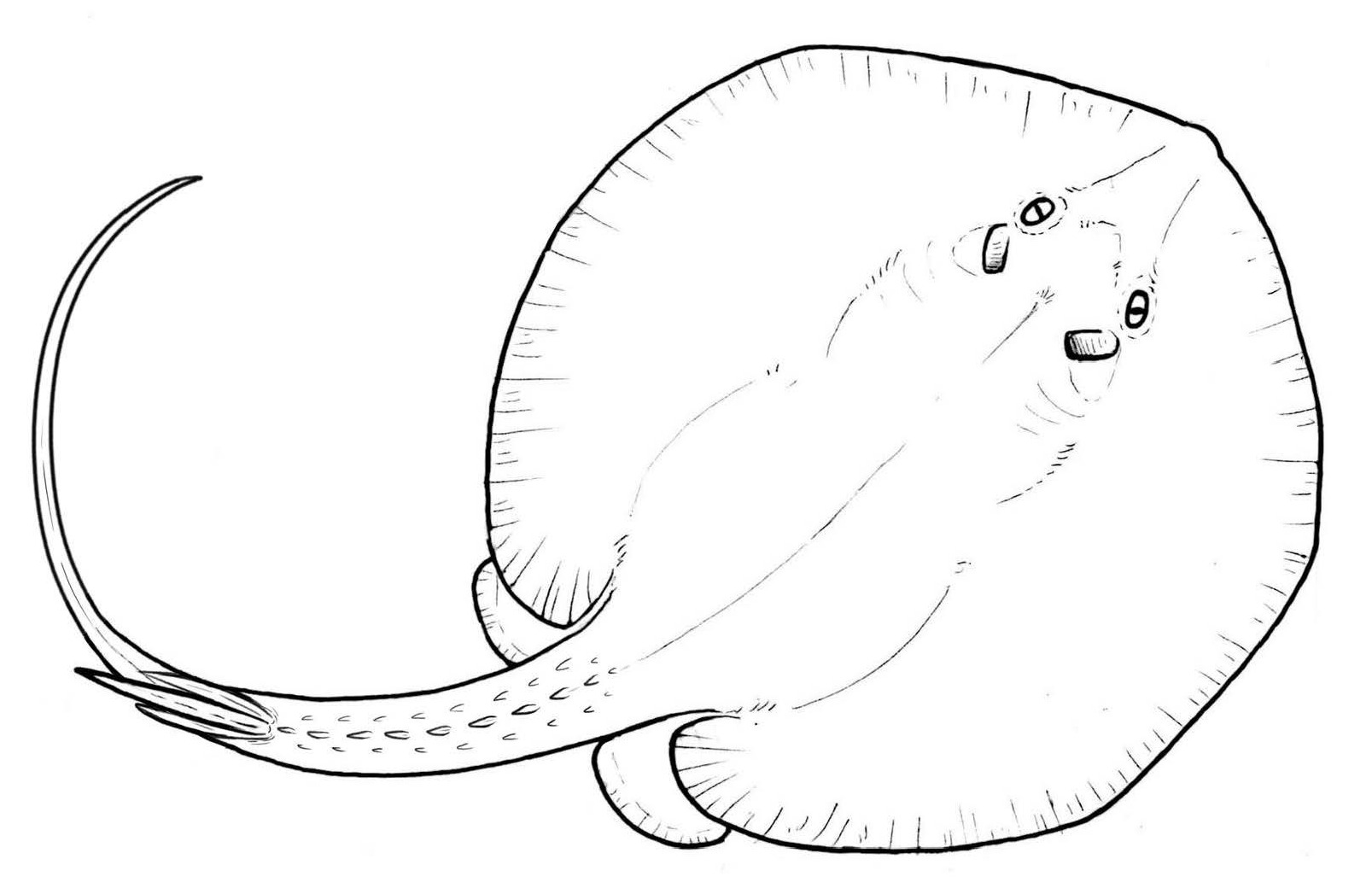
Life restoration

Heliobatis reached up to about 50 centimetres (20 in) in length. As in modern stingrays the genders are dimorphic, with males possessing claspers. Heliobatis individuals have up to three modified dermal denticles, forming barbed stingers, on their tails, though individuals are often found with less than three. The genus is considered to have been demersal in nature. As in the modern skate genus Raja the teeth of Heliobatis are small and closely spaced. The teeth are triangular and shaped for feeding on small fish, crustaceans, and mollusks. Heliobatis is notably abundant at the same site on Fossil Lake where the only Green River Formation crayfish, Procambarus primaevus, and prawns Bechleja rostrata are found. The genus has a long tail which is very slender, often missing the tip, sporting small spines along the dorsal midline. The tail provides up to half of the total body length.
