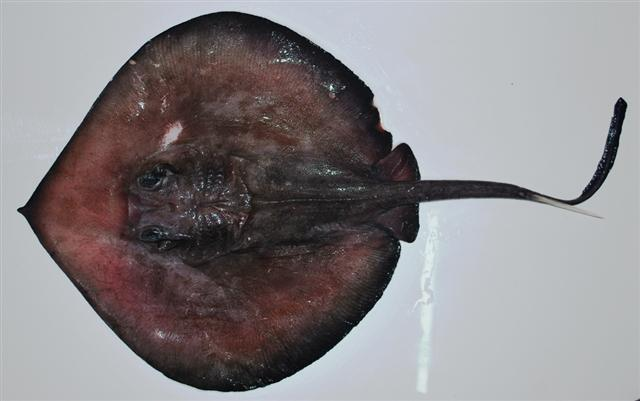

Conservation status
- Least Concern (IUCN 3.1)

Scientific classification
- Kingdom: Animalia
- Phylum: Chordata
- Class: Chondrichthyes
- Subclass: Elasmobranchii
- Division: Batomorphi
- Order: Myliobatiformes
- Family: Plesiobatidae; K. Nishida, 1990
- Genus: Plesiobatis; K. Nishida, 1990
- Species: P. daviesi

Binomial name
- Plesiobatis daviesi (J. H. Wallace, 1967)
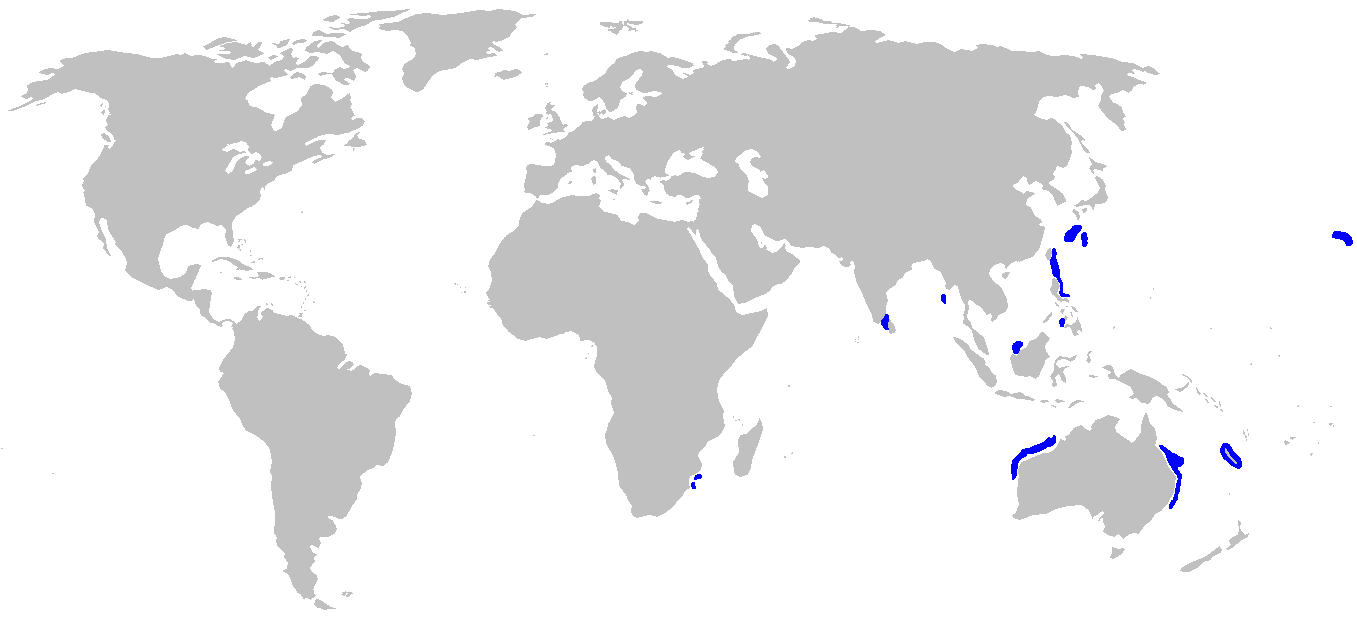
- Range of the deepwater stingray

Synonyms
- Urolophus marmoratus Chu, Hu & Li, 1981; Urotrygon daviesi J. H. Wallace, 1967

= Deepwater stingray =

Species of cartilaginous fish

The deepwater stingray or giant stingaree (Plesiobatis daviesi) is a species of stingray and the sole member of the family Plesiobatidae. It is widely distributed in the Indo-Pacific, typically over fine sediments on the upper continental slope at depths of 275–680 m (900–2,230 ft). This species reaches 2.7 m (8.9 ft) in length and 1.5 m (4.9 ft) in width. It has an oval pectoral fin disc with a long, flexible, broad-angled snout. Most of the entire latter half of its tail supports a distinctively long, slender, leaf-shaped caudal fin. Its coloration is dark above and white below, and its skin is almost completely covered by tiny dermal denticles.

Preying on crustaceans, cephalopods, and bony fishes, the deepwater stingray may hunt both on the sea floor and well above it in open water. It is likely aplacental viviparous, with the mother supplying her gestating young with histotroph ("uterine milk"). Captured rays merit caution due to their long, venomous stingers. This species is taken by deepwater commercial fisheries, but in numbers too small to significantly threaten its population. Therefore, the International Union for Conservation of Nature has assessed it as Least Concern.

== Taxonomy and phylogeny ==
The first scientific description of the deepwater stingray was authored by John H. Wallace, as part of a 1967 Investigational Report from the Oceanographic Research Institute, Durban. He named the new species daviesi in honor of David H. Davies, the late director of the ORI, and placed it in the genus Urotrygon based on its long, low caudal fin and lack of a dorsal fin. The type specimens were collected during September 1996 near the Limpopo River mouth in Mozambique: the holotype is a mature male 92 cm (36 in) across, and the paratype is an immature male 33 cm (13 in) across. Other common names for this species include Davies' stingray and giant stingray.

In a 1990 morphological phylogenetic study, Kiyonori Nishida concluded that the deepwater stingray and the sixgill stingray (Hexatrygon bickelli) were the most basal stingrays (suborder Myliobatoidei). Therefore, he moved this species to its own genus, Plesiobatis, and family, Plesiobatidae; the name is derived from the Greek plesio ("primitive") and batis ("ray"). Subsequent morphological studies have corroborated the basal position of Plesiobatis, but disagreed on its relationships to nearby taxa. John McEachran, Katherine Dunn, and Tsutomu Miyake in 1996 could not fully resolve the position of Plesiobatis, thus they assigned it provisionally to the family Hexatrygonidae. McEachran and Neil Aschliman in 2004 found Plesiobatis to be the sister taxon of Urolophus, and recommended that it be placed in the family Urolophidae. Until the phylogeny is better-resolved, authors have tended to preserve the family Plesiobatidae.

== Distribution and habitat ==
Records of the deepwater stingray come from a number of locations scattered widely in the Indo-Pacific: KwaZulu-Natal in South Africa and Mozambique, the Gulf of Mannar, the northern Andaman Islands, the South China Sea, the Ryukyu Islands and the Kyushu–Palau Ridge, along the southern coastline of Australia, northwestern Australia from the Rowley Shoals to Shark Bay, northeastern Australia from Townsville to Wooli, New Caledonia, and Hawaii. This bottom-dwelling species generally inhabits the upper continental slope at depths of 275–680 m (900–2,230 ft), over muddy or silty substrates. An anomalous record from only 44 m (144 ft) deep off Mozambique was made. It seems to be locally common in tropical Australian waters, but may be rarer elsewhere.

== Description ==
The deepwater stingray has a flabby body, with enlarged pectoral fins forming a disc usually longer than it is wide. The leading margins of the disc converge at a broad angle. The snout is thin and measures over six times as long as the diameter of the orbit; the snout tip protrudes slightly from the disc. The small eyes are positioned just ahead of the spiracles, which have angular posterior rims. The large, circular nostrils are placed close to the mouth, to which they are connected by a pair of broad grooves. Between the nostrils is a broad curtain of skin with a strongly fringed posterior margin. The wide, straight mouth contains 32–60 tooth rows in either jaw, increasing in number with age. Each tooth is small with a low, blunt cusp; in adult males the teeth at the center are sharp and backward-pointing. The five pairs of gill slits are small and placed beneath the disc.

The pelvic fins are small and have blunt outer corners. The moderately thick tail measures 93–102% as long as the disc and lacks lateral skin folds and dorsal fins. One or two serrated stinging spines are present atop the tail, just ahead of the halfway point. The slender caudal fin originates a short distance behind the sting; it is symmetrical above and below, and terminates in a rounded leaf-like shape. The skin is densely covered by fine dermal denticles, that become sparse to absent on the pelvic fins, towards the ventral disc margin, and around the mouth. The deepwater stingray is purplish brown to blackish above; some rays also have irregular darker blotches and spots. The underside is white, with a narrow dark border along the lateral disc margins. The tail is entirely dark, and the caudal fin is black. This large species grows up to 2.7 m (8.9 ft) long, 1.5 m (4.9 ft) across, and 118 kg (260 lb) in weight off southern Africa, though it is not known to exceed 2.0 m (6.6 ft) long off Australia.

== Biology and ecology ==
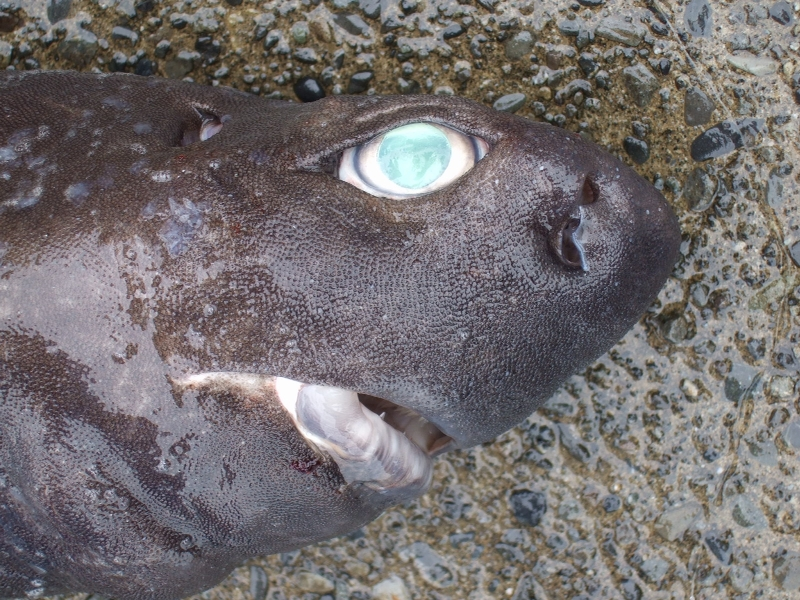
The kitefin shark is known to attack the deepwater stingray.

The diet of the deepwater stingray consists of cephalopods, crustaceans (including penaeid prawns, crabs, and lobsters), and bony fishes (including eels). Its long, flexible snout is well-suited for rooting through sediment, while the presence of mesopelagic species in its diet suggest that it may also hunt well above the sea floor. One recorded individual was found severely gouged by kitefin sharks (Dalatias licha), which are capable of excising plugs of flesh, cookiecutter-like, from larger animals. The deepwater stingray is presumed to be similar to other stingrays in being aplacental viviparous, and having the developing embryos nourished by maternally produced histotroph ("uterine milk"). Given its large size and deepwater habits, it is probably not highly prolific, with a small litter size and a long gestation period. The young are apparently born at close to 50 cm (20 in) long, as evidenced by the capture of a free-living specimen of that size that still bore a yolk sac scar. Males and females mature sexually at 1.3–1.7 m (4.3–5.6 ft) and 1.9–2.0 m (6.2–6.6 ft) long, respectively. The maximum size, and likely also the maturation size, varies between geographic regions.

== Human interactions ==
When captured, the deepwater stingray flails its powerful tail violently, and its long, venomous sting can inflict a serious injury to a fishery worker. It is caught incidentally by deepwater bottom trawls and longlines; the meat may be sold, but is poorly regarded. None of the deepwater commercial fisheries operating within its range (including those off South Africa, Taiwan, Indonesia and Australia) are extensive, and thus only small numbers of deepwater stingrays are landed. As a result, the International Union for Conservation of Nature has determined this species to be minimally threatened by human activity, and listed it under least concern. However, should deepwater fisheries expand in the future, it may be susceptible to depletion due to its probable rarity and low reproductive rate.
