= CSIRO Marine Research =

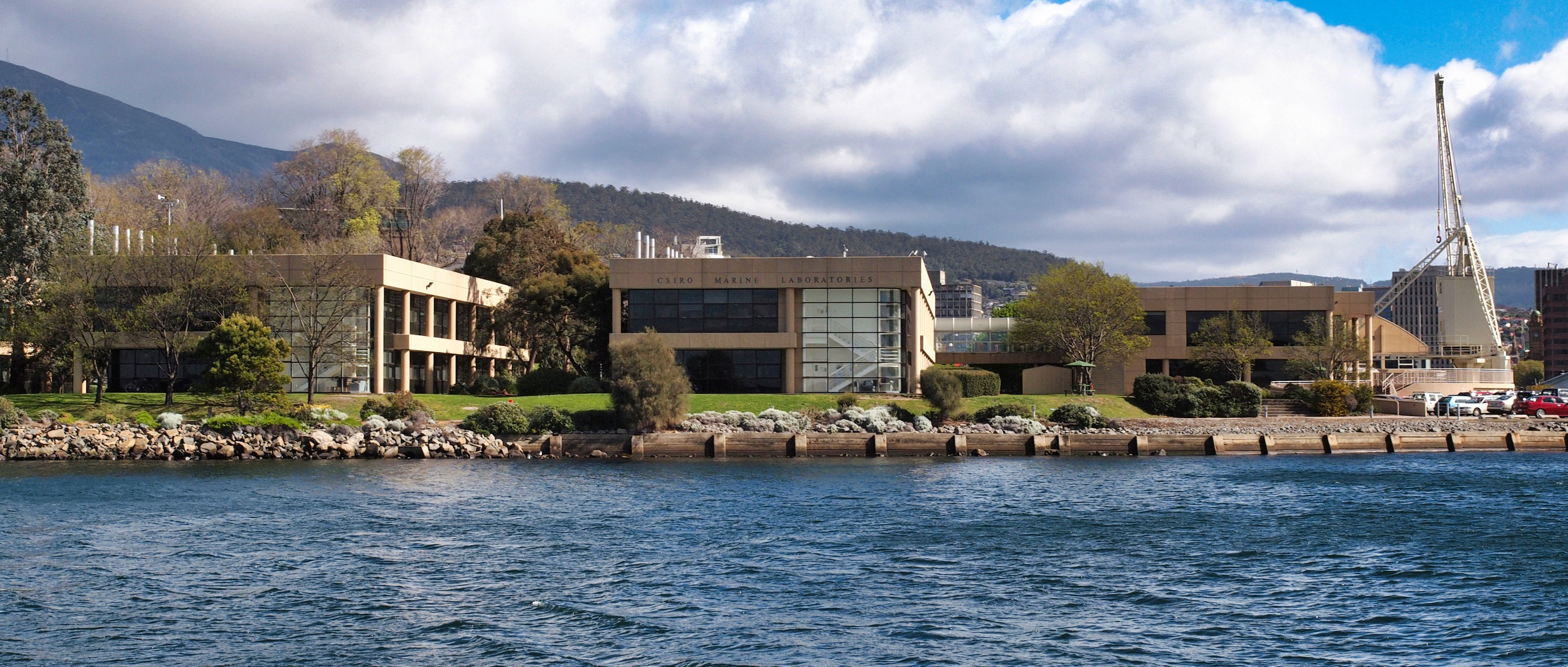
- Abbreviation: CMR
- Formation: 1997
- Dissolved: 2005
- Type: Research division
- Headquarters: Hobart, Tasmania
- Coordinates: 42°53′14″S 147°20′19″E
- Fields: Marine Research
- Parent organization: CSIRO | Commonwealth Scientific and Industrial Research Organisation
- Website: https://research.csiro.au

CSIRO Marine Research (CMR) (1997–2005) was a research section (Division) of CSIRO, Australia's largest government-supported science research agency, formed as a merger between the pre-existing Divisions of Fisheries and Oceanography. In July 2005 it was merged with the Division of Atmospheric Research to form Marine and Atmospheric Research.

== Description and formation ==
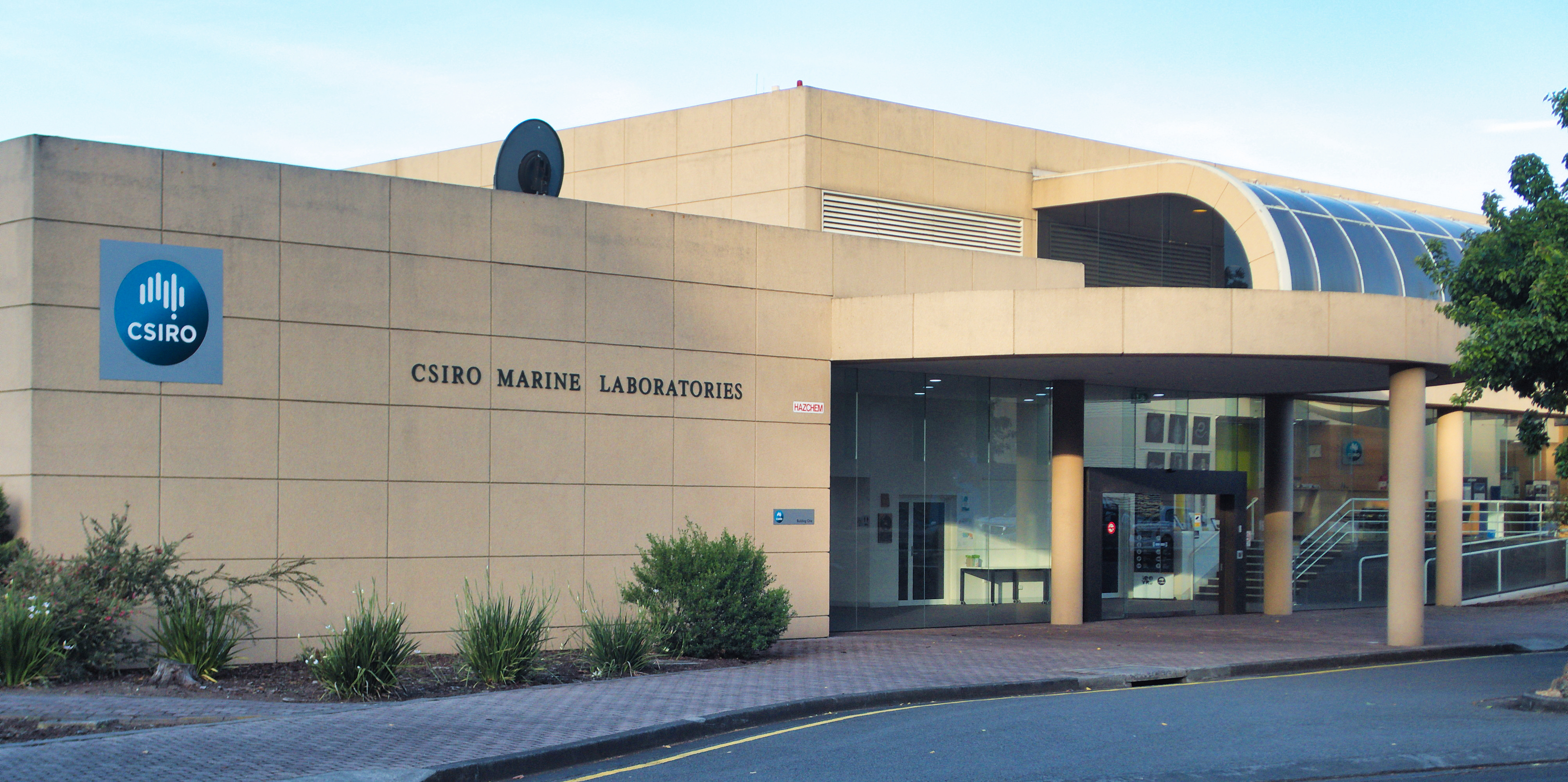
CSIRO Marine Laboratories, Castray Esplanade, Hobart (2017 photograph), home to CSIRO Marine Research and its forerunners/successors

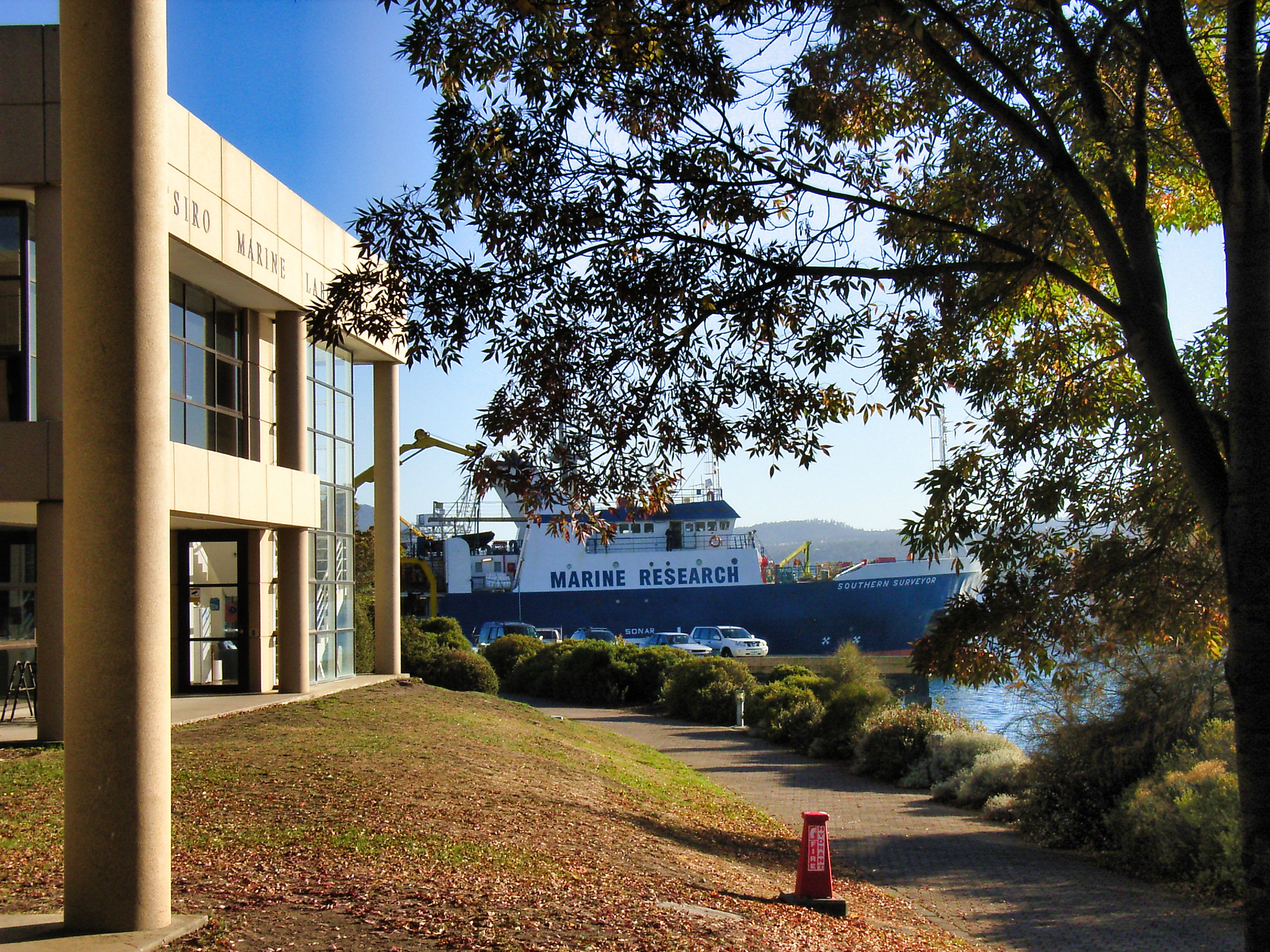
RV Southern Surveyor leaving Hobart, March 2008; although the Division had by then expanded to become "CSIRO Marine and Atmospheric Research" via a merger, the logo on the ship remained unchanged.

CSIRO Marine Research (full/alternate name: CSIRO Division of Marine Research; abbreviation within CSIRO: CMR) was a Division of CSIRO (the Commonwealth Scientific Industrial and Research Organisation), Australia's national science research agency, in existence from 1997 to 2005. It was formed as a merger between the pre-existing Divisions of Fisheries and Oceanography, which had been separated since 1981, but previously a single Division "Fisheries and Oceanography". It ceased to exist as a named entity (although its work was carried on) in 2005 when it was merged with the CSIRO Division of Atmospheric Research under the new name CSIRO Marine and Atmospheric Research. The merger was noted without any stated rationale in the 1996-97 CSIRO Annual Report, thus it is not on the public record whether the drivers were scientific or cost saving (maintaining the overheads of a single larger Division notionally more efficient than for two smaller ones), or perhaps both; in any event, many aspects of the science operations continued virtually unchanged, with oceanographers continuing to study the physics and chemistry of the oceans, and fisheries scientists the biota that lived within them, plus providing advice to managers with respect to sustainable harvesting. (Note: Historically, oceanographers tend to have backgrounds in mathematics, physics or chemistry, and study the oceans and their features irrespective of whether or not they sustain fisheries; they may also have an interest in how the oceans affect global climate. Fisheries scientists, on the other hand, are biologists who are interested in the quantities and distributions of fish that live in the oceans, their value as a resource for human or other consumption, their biology (including the food chains that support them), and/or their conservation as representatives of marine biodiversity, although clearly the prevailing oceanographic conditions play a part in governing distributions and life cycles of the species under study. Fisheries scientists also tend to work closely with the fishing industry, and with managers of fishing activity (typically governments) who have a responsibility to prevent over-fishing of available stocks. Research vessels for fishery activities tend to be ships equipped with trawl nets and other gear for sampling fish populations (thus are often converted trawlers), whereas oceanographic vessels are often smaller and more like floating analytical laboratories; they may also travel to locations which are of little or no interest for fisheries research. The merits, or not, of combining the two disciplines under the auspices of a single research agency can be debated both ways: clearly one position was taken in 1980 when the two Divisions were split, then the opposite one in 1995 when they were merged again.) One benefit of the merger was the formation of a Divisional Data Centre to manage and disseminate scientific data from both former Divisions from a single access point.

== Location ==
Its headquarters and the largest complement of its staff were based at the CSIRO Marine Laboratories in Hobart, Tasmania, while additional staff were located at the previously constructed Division of Fisheries laboratories at Cleveland, a suburb of Brisbane, and Marmion, a suburb of Perth; for descriptions of the latter, refer relevant chapters in Mawson et al., 1988, "CSIRO at Sea".

== Staffing and budget ==
According to figures on the Division's website from April 1998, at that date the Division employed 370 science and support staff across its three locations, with around 280 of these based in Hobart. In 1998 its annual operating budget was approximately AUD$35 million.

== Activities ==
As at 1998, selected aspects of the work of the Division were arranged in seven "example areas", namely The Ocean's Role in Climate; Sustainable Fisheries Management; Aquaculture; Marine Pests; Coastal Environment and Marine Pollution; Biotechnology; and Australia's Marine Territory. By 2005, a set of "research priorities" was listed, comprising Sustainable aquaculture production; Marine environment prediction; Sustainable fisheries; Climate processes and prediction; and Managing multiple uses.

The Division operated two research vessels, the RV Southern Surveyor for fisheries work and the RV Franklin for oceanography, the latter being managed as the Australian Marine National Facility (MNF) of the day with applications for sea time available by application from any Australian research institution. The Franklin was retired in 2003, with the Southern Surveyor undergoing a refit to take over its role.

== Publications ==
A 2026 search on "Google Scholar" yields about 4,400 results (articles plus monographs) that include "CSIRO Marine Research" in the text, the majority comprising works authored by staff of the Division as primary or associate author.

== Divisional chiefs ==
Source: CSIROpedia

- 1995–97 Christoph Bruno Fandry
- 1998–2002 Nancy Amanda Bray
- 2002–05 Anthony Douglas John (Tony) Haymet

From 2005 the Division ceased to exist in a formal sense, being replaced by CSIRO Marine and Atmospheric Research (incoming chief: Gregory Peter Ayers)

== See also ==
- CSIRO
- CSIRO Oceans and Atmosphere
- RV Southern Surveyor
- RV Franklin
