= CSIRO Marine Laboratories =

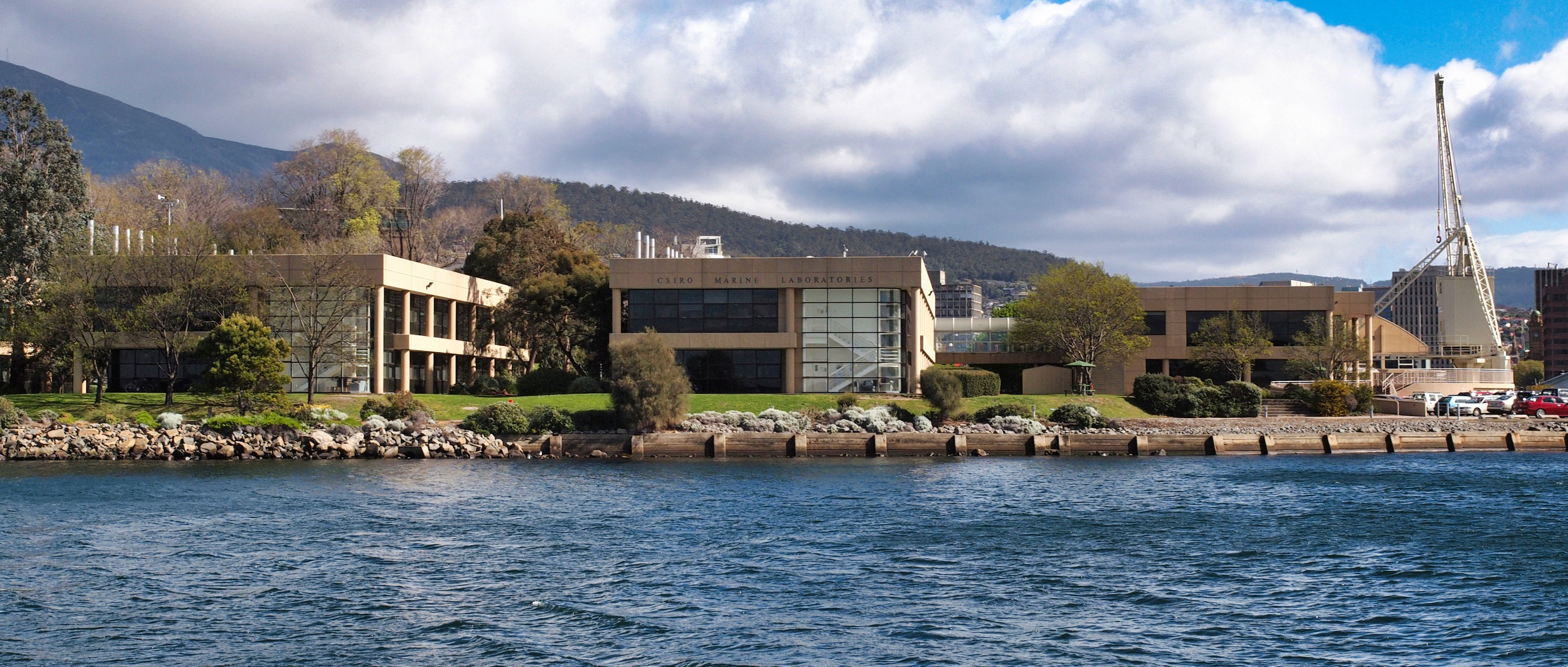
- View from the east
- Interactive map of the CSIRO Marine Laboratories area

General information
- Status: Completed
- Type: Research laboratory
- Architectural style: 1980s functional
- Location: Castray Esplanade, Hobart, Tasmania, Australia
- Coordinates: 42°53′14″S 147°20′19″E
- Elevation: 4 m (13 ft)
- Construction started: 1 July 1982
- Opened: 1 May 1985
- Cost: A$11.8 million, equivalent to A$125 million in 2022
- Client: CSIRO
- Owner: CSIRO

Design and construction
- Architect: H.C-H. Leong
- Main contractor: Hansen and Yuncken (Tas) Pty Ltd.

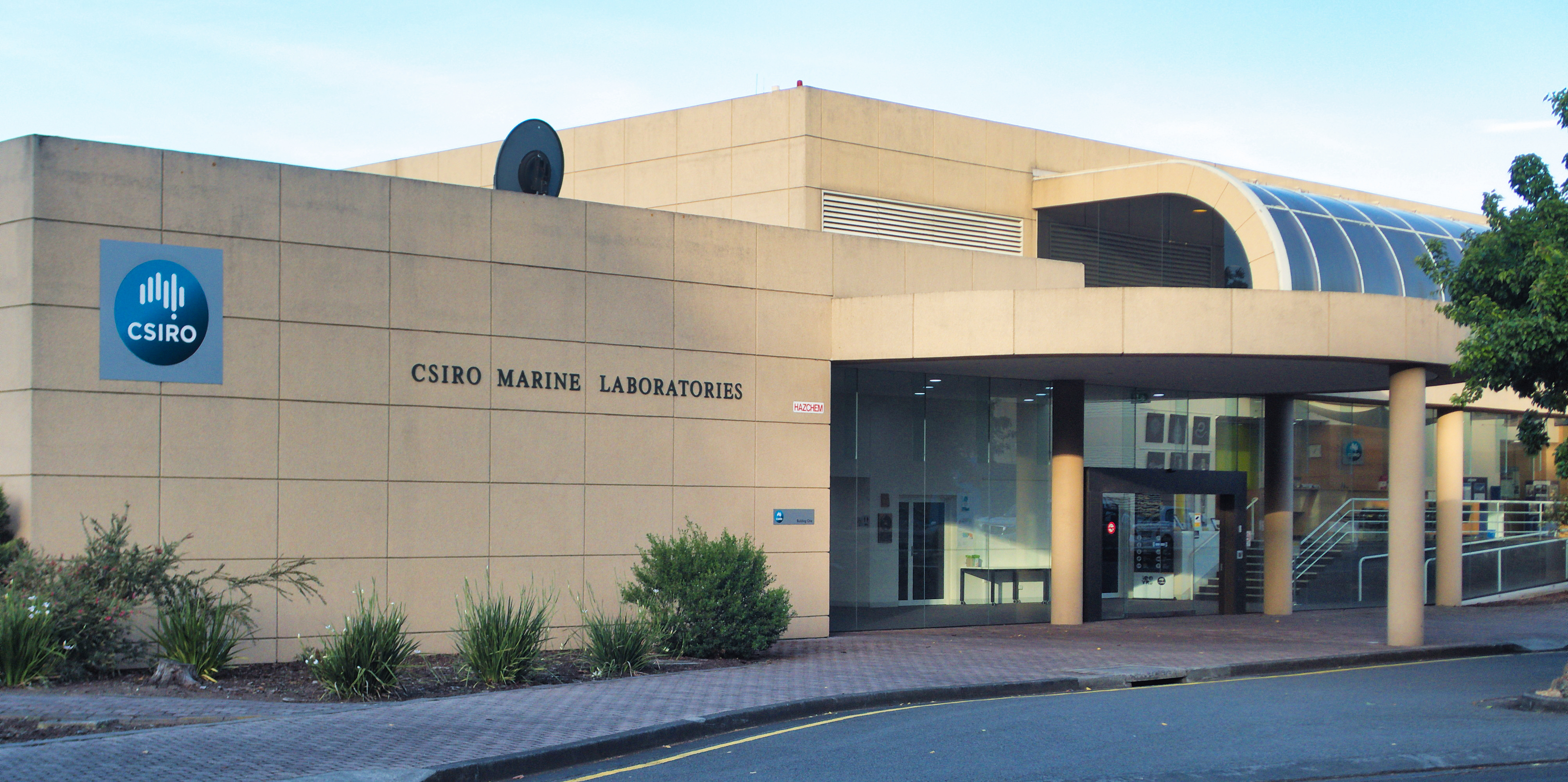
Entrance to CSIRO Marine Laboratories, Castray Esplanade, Hobart (2017 photograph).

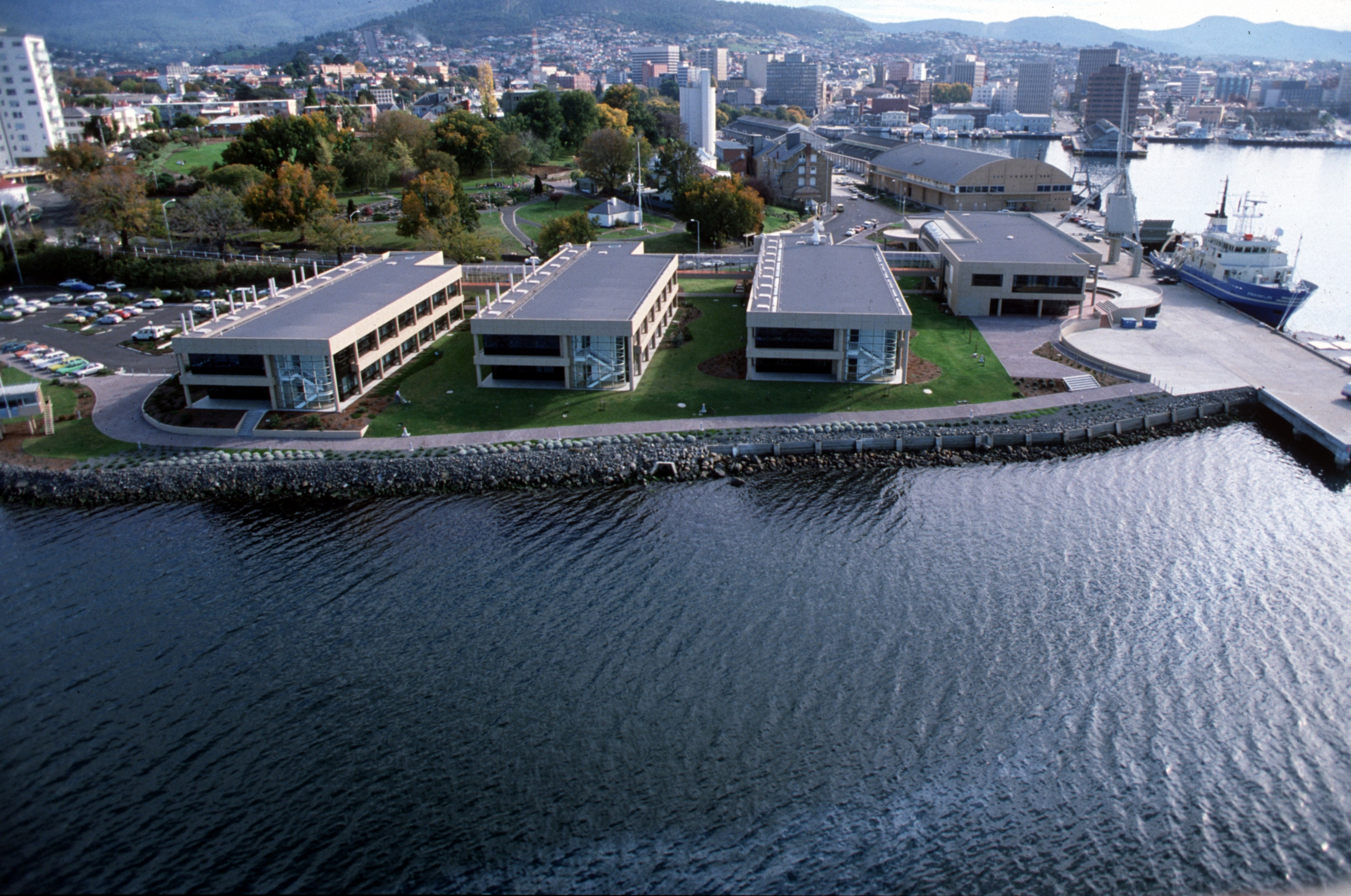
Aerial view of the CSIRO Marine Laboratories, taken shortly after their construction, c.1984

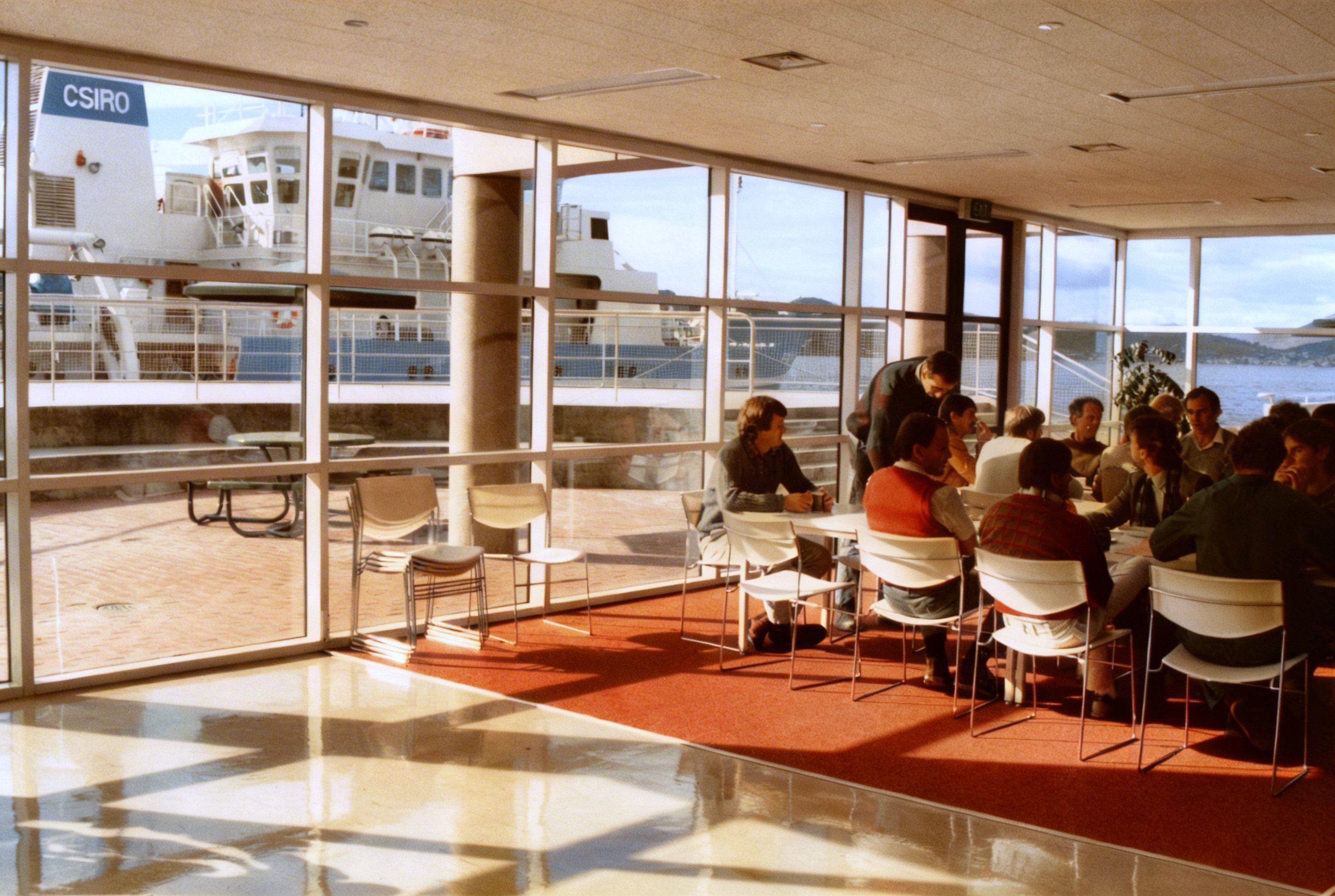
CSIRO Hobart canteen with RV Franklin adjacent, July 1986

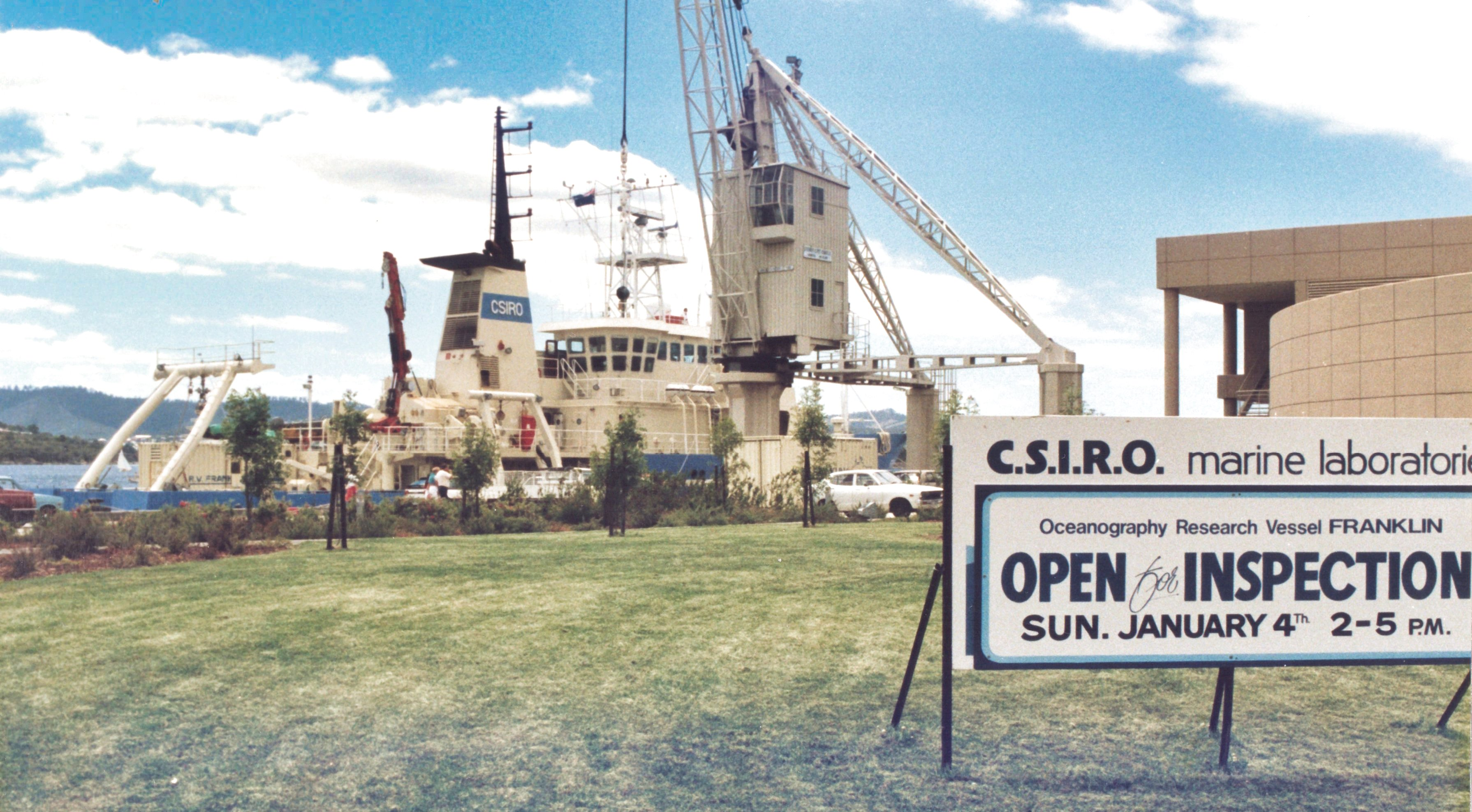
Open day at the RV Franklin while moored at the CSIRO Marine Laboratories, January 1987

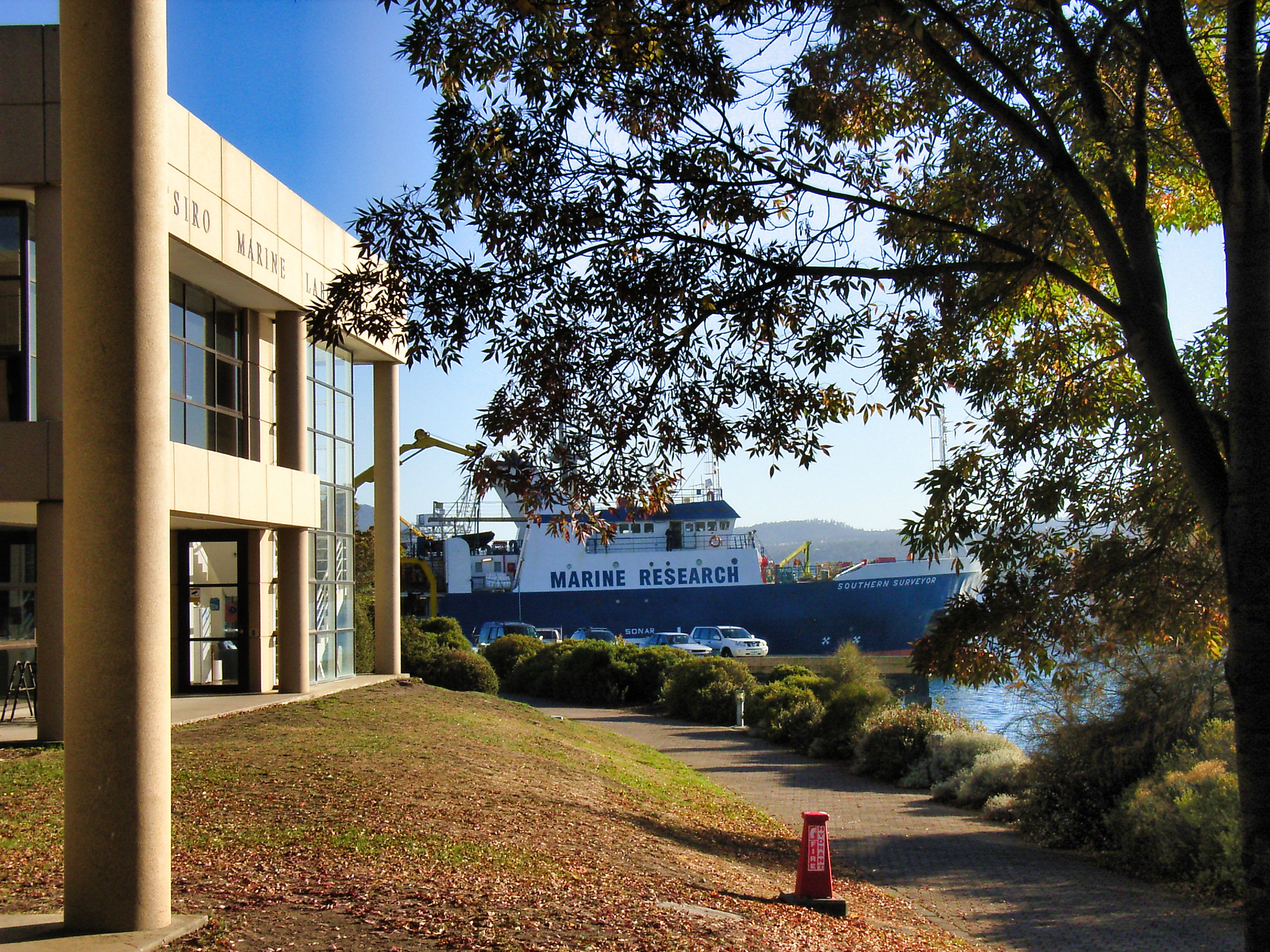
RV Southern Surveyor leaving the Marine Laboratories, March 2008

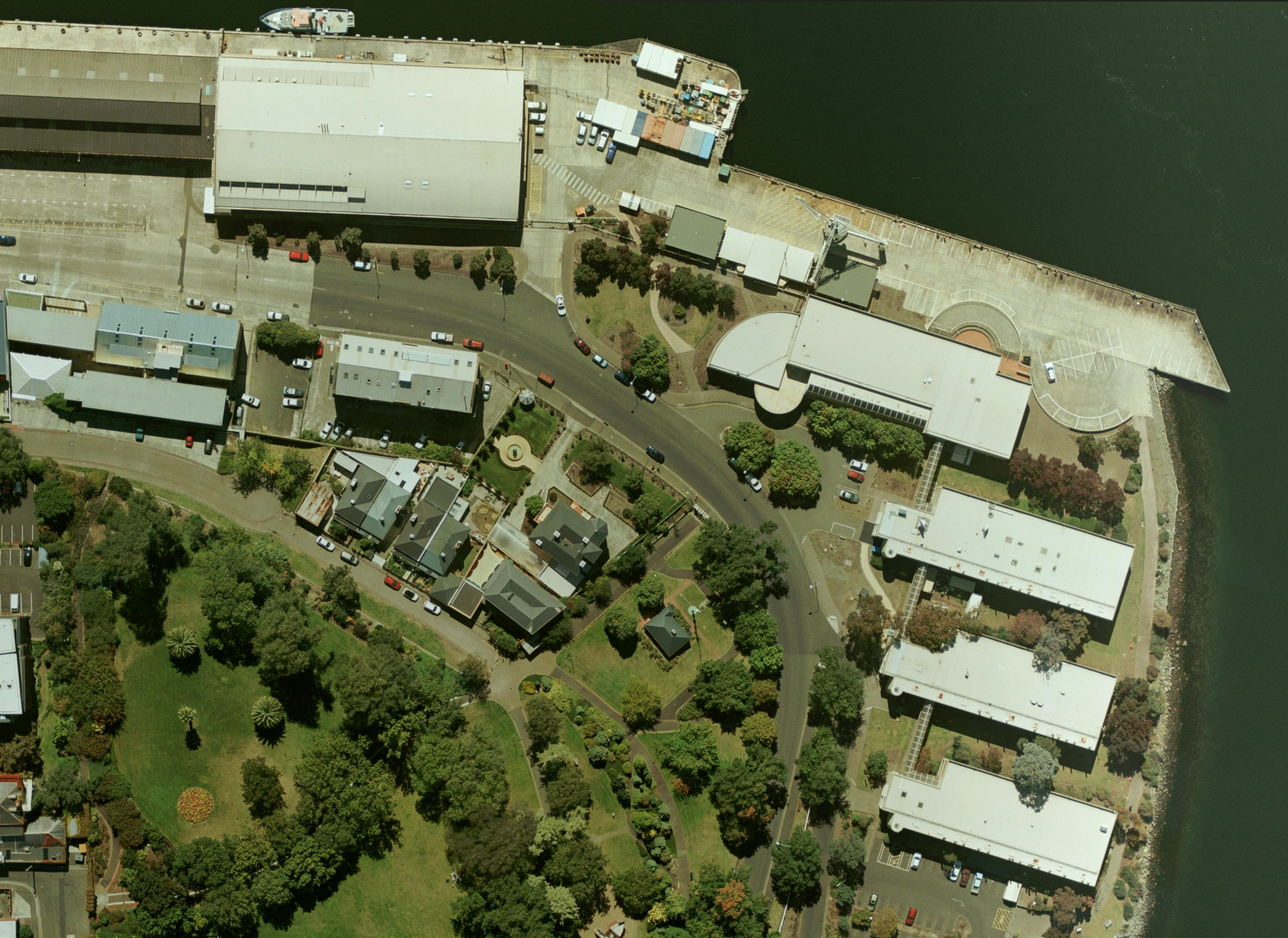
CSIRO Marine Laboratories, Hobart, aerial view 6 Mar 2011 (Lands Dept., Tasmania)

The CSIRO Marine Laboratories are a purpose-built complex of science laboratories together with an administration and amenities block and a research support building, situated on Castray Esplanade adjacent to Princes Wharf on Sullivans Cove in Hobart, Tasmania, Australia. The buildings were constructed over the period 1982–1984 at a quoted cost of AUD$11.8 million, to provide new facilities to house the then CSIRO Division of Fisheries Research and the newly separated Division of Oceanography, formerly co-located in Cronulla, New South Wales, with an adjacent deep-water wharf capable of handling both Divisions' research vessels including the newly constructed Marine National Facility RV Franklin, delivered in 1985. Both the buildings and the Marine National Facility were part of a substantial (AUD$25m) upgrade to Australia's marine research capability introduced during the term of the 1975–1983 Liberal–Country party coalition Fraser Government, and continued by its successor, the Bob Hawke–led Australian Labor Party government, which took over in 1983. The laboratories continue in use as a CSIRO facility at time of writing (2026) as do the berthing facilities for the current Marine National Facility, the RV Investigator.

== Overview ==
The CSIRO Marine Laboratories are a building complex on Castray Esplanade in Hobart, Tasmania, Australia, constructed in 1982–1984 to house the CSIRO Divisions of Fisheries Research and Oceanography (formerly a single Division, named Fisheries and Oceanography) which was transferred from its previous location at Hungry Point, Cronulla, New South Wales; the building was officially opened by the (Australian) Federal Minister for Science, the Hon Barry Jones in May 1985. It occupies a site at the end of Princes Wharf originally created as a terminal for the vehicle and passenger ferry Empress of Australia which ceased its Hobart operation in 1972; the former Wharf "Shed No 3" was incorporated into the new complex as the Support Facilities building. The names of the CSIRO Divisions occupying the complex have changed many times, first with Fisheries Research changing to Fisheries, then Fisheries and Oceanography (2 Divisions) becoming a single Division CSIRO Marine Research, then merging with the former (separate) CSIRO Atmospheric Research Division to become CSIRO Marine and Atmospheric Research, then changing its name again to CSIRO Oceans and Atmosphere with a merger with the former "Wealth from Oceans" Flagship, and most recently merging again, this time with CSIRO Land and Water to form a new "Business Unit" called simply "Environment". Additional details of the somewhat convoluted organisational history of the relevant Divisions and their predecessors are available here. A summary of the scope and activities carried out at the Marine Laboratories at that time was published by the scientific assistants to the Chiefs of both Divisions, N.G. Elliot and A.C. Woods, in 1989.

The CSIRO Marine Laboratories houses the administrative offices and provides the home port for the Australian Marine National Facility, currently the RV Investigator (2014–present), which was preceded by the RV Southern Surveyor (acquired by CSIRO 1988, transferred to National Facility role 2003) and RV Franklin (1984–2003).

== Background ==
CSIRO, Australia's national science research agency, established a Division of Fisheries (previously the "Fisheries Investigation Section") in May 1940. By 1956 it had become the Division of Fisheries and Oceanography, occupying (by the mid-1970s) a rocky promontory site at Cronulla, New South Wales above the Port Hacking estuary, with smaller satellite laboratories at Cleveland, a suburb of Brisbane in Queensland and Marmion, a suburb of Perth in Western Australia, from which surveys of adjacent waters could be carried out.

By the late 1970s it was becoming clear that the Cronulla site had serious limitations, in particular it had limited room for expansion due to its size and the unsuitable nature of the terrain; a number of its buildings were getting old and past their lifetimes of useful service; and the site had no direct access to deep water harbour facilities, as possessed by many other marine and/or ocean research operations around the world, suitable for berthing of existing or planned future research vessels, or on site storage for associated large volume equipment (nets, etc.). Encouraged by the then Fraser government, which also favoured a policy of rebuilding or relocating infrastructure in regional Australia, a search was commenced for a suitable new site somewhere in Australia where new facilities to support Commonwealth-focussed marine biological (fisheries related) and oceanographic research activities could be constructed.

Following various reviews and consideration of alternatives, by February 1980 the CSIRO Executive was able to announce that "the Division of Fisheries and Oceanography was to be split into two, each headed by a new chief; that the oceanography section would be expanded to over 60 staff; that new marine laboratories would be built on a waterfront site in Hobart; that CSIRO would have a new oceanographic research vessel, to be run as a National Facility; and that ... all the facilities, costing a total of 25 million dollars [were expected to be ready] in three or four years' time." As summarised in a 1981 report to the Australian Parliament, bearing in mind the considerations mentioned above, a wharf-side site at Castray Esplanade close to the centre of Hobart had been selected as the most suitable, being vacant land (apart from a pre-existing Marine Board wharf shed, some disused terminal buildings plus a heavy duty crane) previously leased to the Australian National Line (ANL) as a terminal for the former Empress of Australia Sydney-to-Hobart passenger and vehicle ferry service, part owned by the Marine Board of Hobart with the balance being (Tasmanian) State Crown Land, also incorporating Princes Wharf portions 3 and 4.

In addition to the provision of wharf facilities sufficient to accommodate "vessels with a draught of up to 6 metres", the Committee preparing the report noted that the site was level and large enough to permit the construction of the facilities envisaged, had ready access to service industries and an airport, close proximity to tertiary institutions, and was "a location that would be attractive to scientific research staff". By the time the 1981 report had been submitted, it was able to include both a site plan and appearance of the proposed new buildings, which comprised refurbishment of the former Princes Wharf Shed no. 3 to provide a support facilities building, plus the construction of four new buildings, one an administrative and amenities wing, plus three essentially identical laboratories wings to house the research activities of both Divisions.

Design of the complex was handled by H.C-H. Leong of the Department of Housing and Construction, and particular emphasis was given to the scale of the building (no more than two stories in height), rendering in a sandstone-effect finish in keeping with adjacent historic buildings of the Sullivans Cove area, maintenance of sight lines from Castray Esplanade to the waterfront by elevation of the walkways between the new buildings, and provision of public access to the waterfront via a pedestrian path between the complex and the Derwent river estuary, with plans accepted following a Parliamentary Public Works Commission meeting in Hobart on 21–22 May 1981. According to the 1981 document cited above, the cost estimate for construction of the new complex was "$10.75 million at February 1981 prices"; a later report (1982) gave the cost as $11.8 million at April 1982 prices.

== Construction and use ==
The tender for construction of the new facility was awarded to the Tasmanian construction firm of Hansen and Yuncken (Tas) Pty Ltd. of Hobart. An official ceremony to mark the beginning of construction was held in July 1982 with the unveiling of a plaque. The conversion of the former Wharf Shed 3 to the Marine Laboratories support services building was completed in August 1983, the doors of the remainder of the complex were opened for occupation in September 1984, and the official opening ceremony was held on 1 May 1985, conducted by the Federal Minister for Science, the Hon Barry Jones, in the presence of the two chiefs of the Divisions and other dignitaries. Since that time the Marine Laboratories—sometimes referred to in more recent official correspondence as the CSIRO "Battery Point Site"—have continued to provide the premises and facilities for Hobart-based marine science work of the CSIRO through a range of changes to organisational arrangements and naming of Divisions/Flagships/Business Units, as well as providing the home port and administrative support for the Marine National Facility (Australian national ocean-going research vessel of the day). The Marine Laboratories also provide a physical home for two of CSIRO's national collections, the Australian National Algae Culture Collection and the Australian National Fish Collection.

== Gallery ==
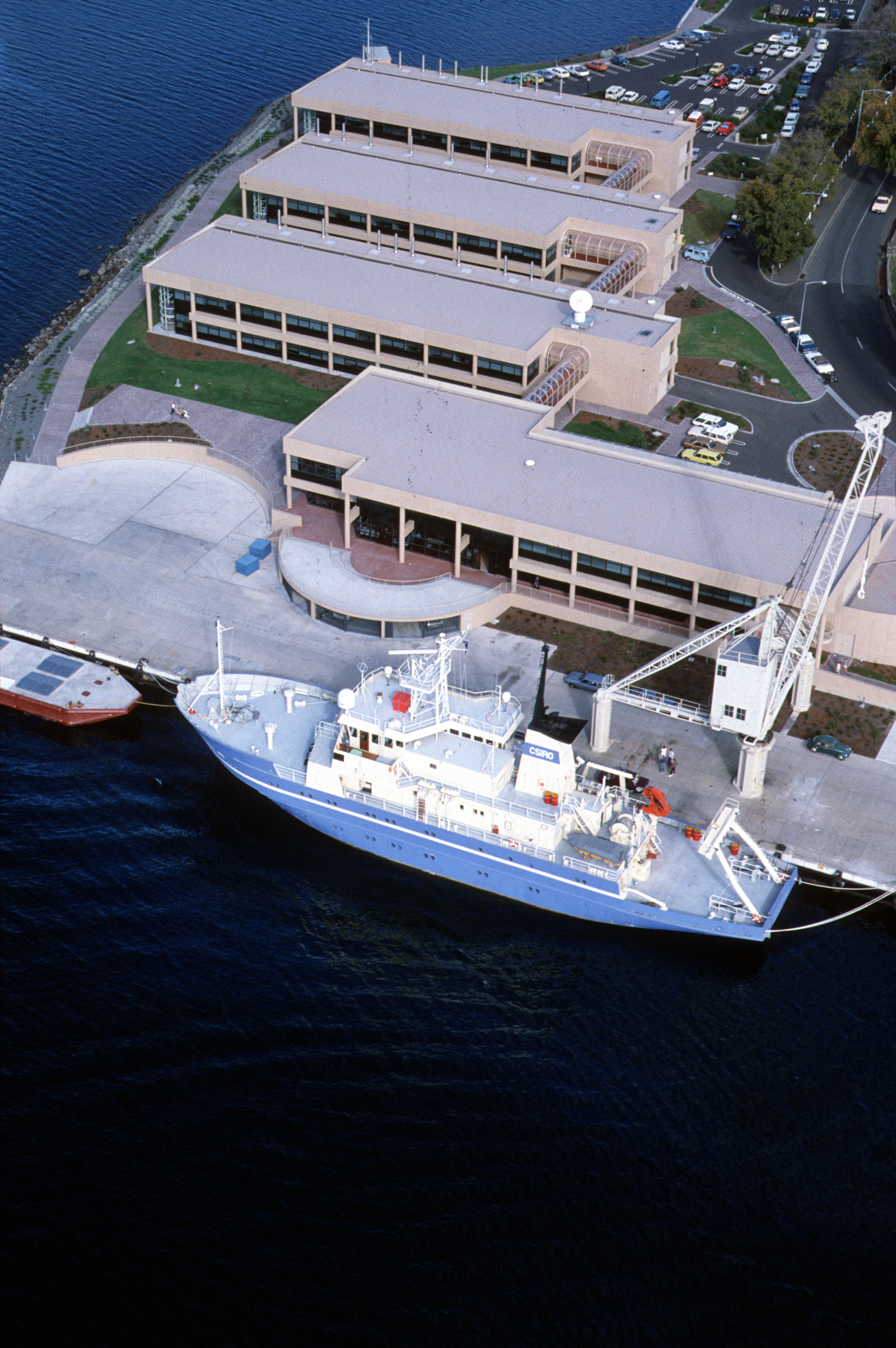
CSIRO Marine Research Laboratories, aerial view with RV Franklin alongside

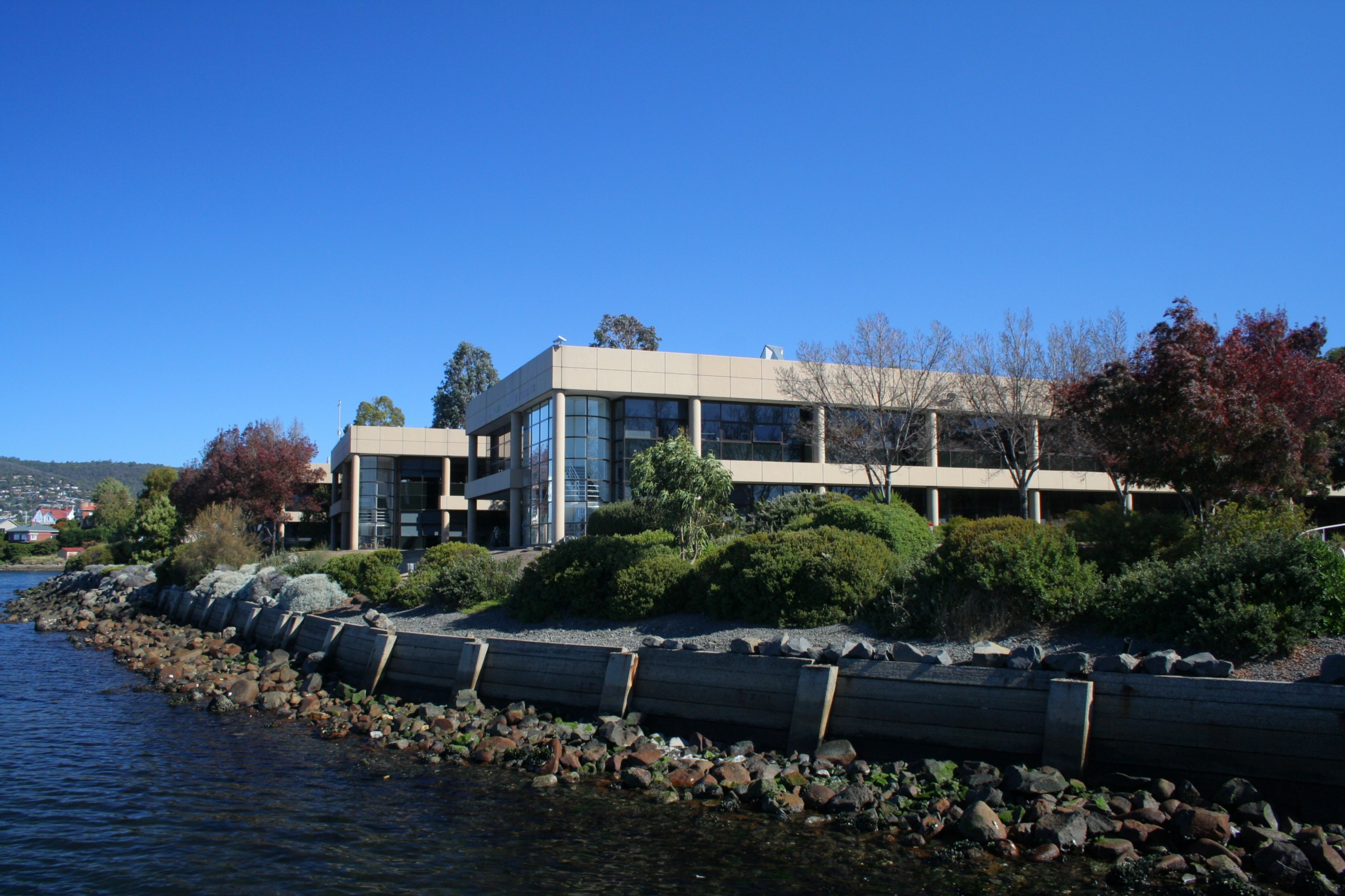
CSIRO Marine Laboratories, waterside view

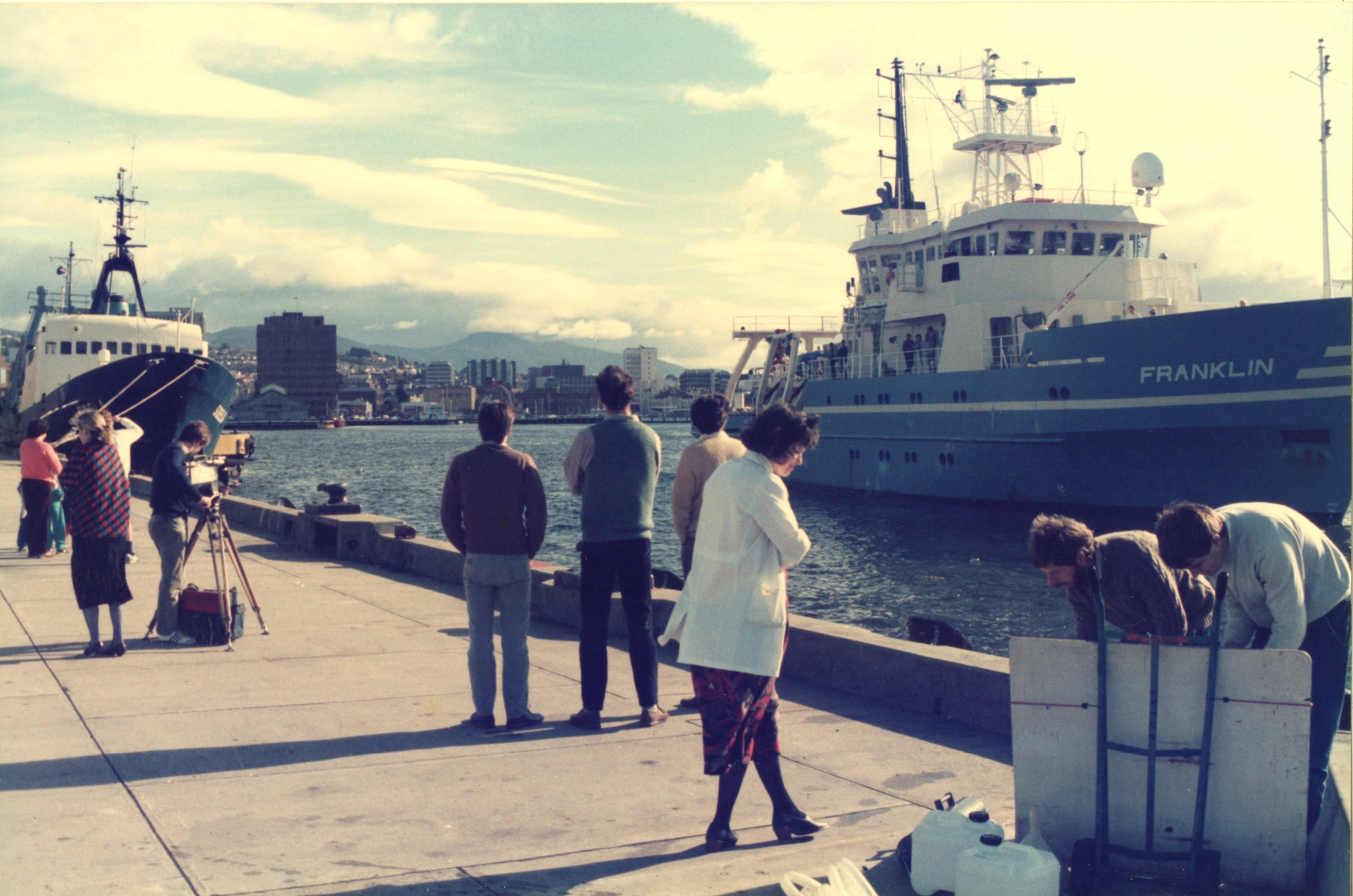
CSIRO wharf, Hobart with research vessels, June 1986

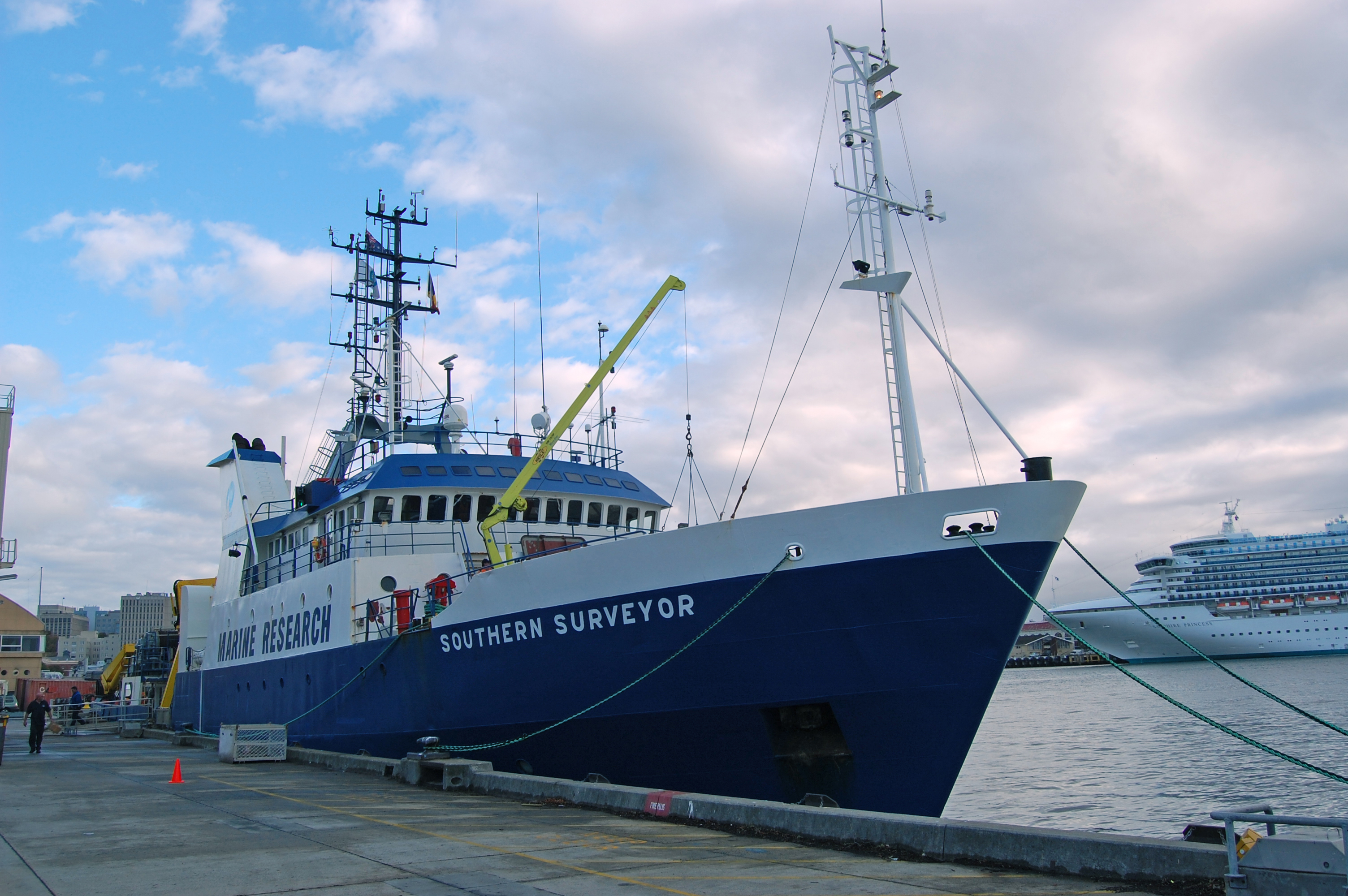
RV Southern Surveyor at the CSIRO wharf

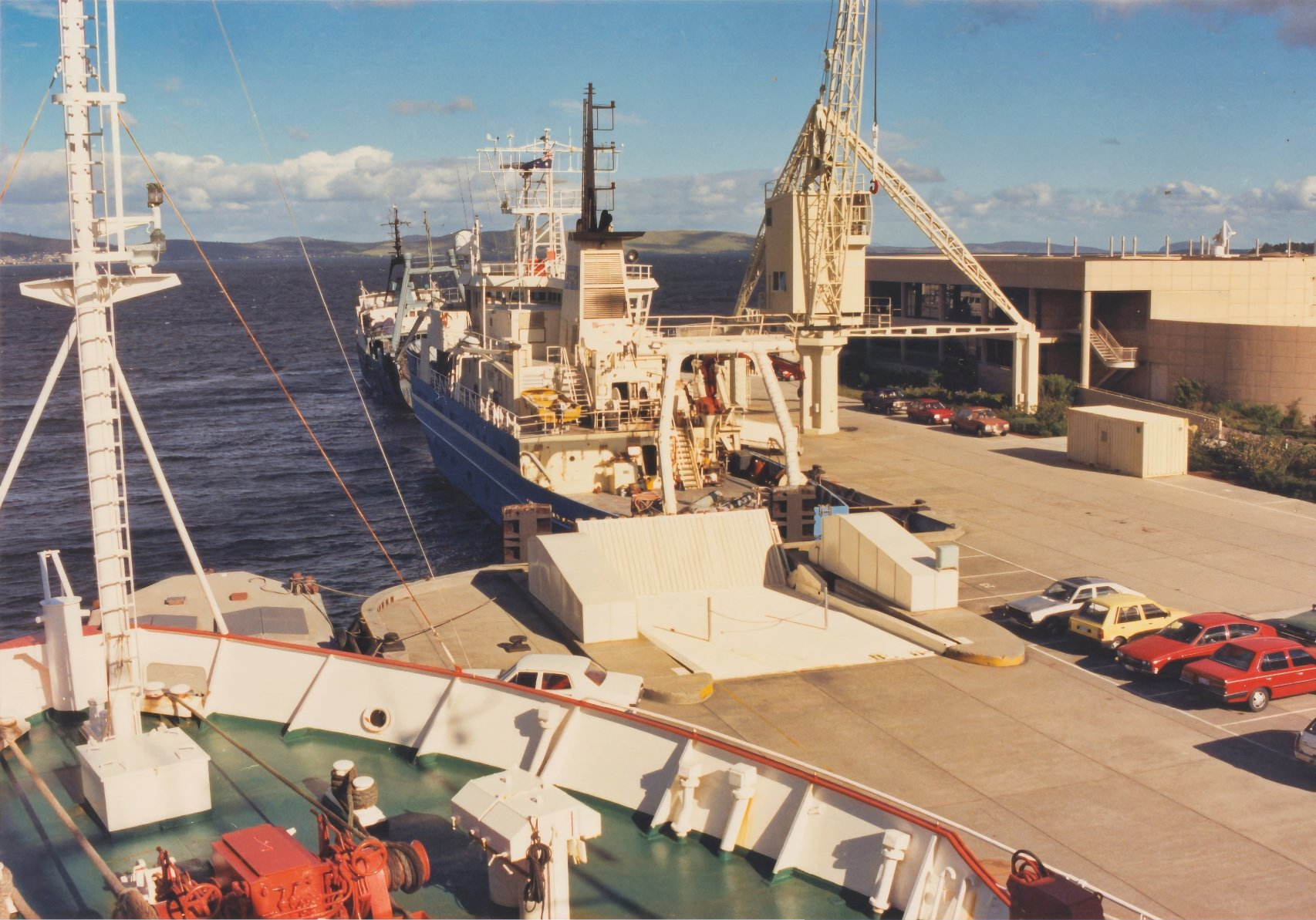
CSIRO wharf, Hobart with research vessels, January 1988

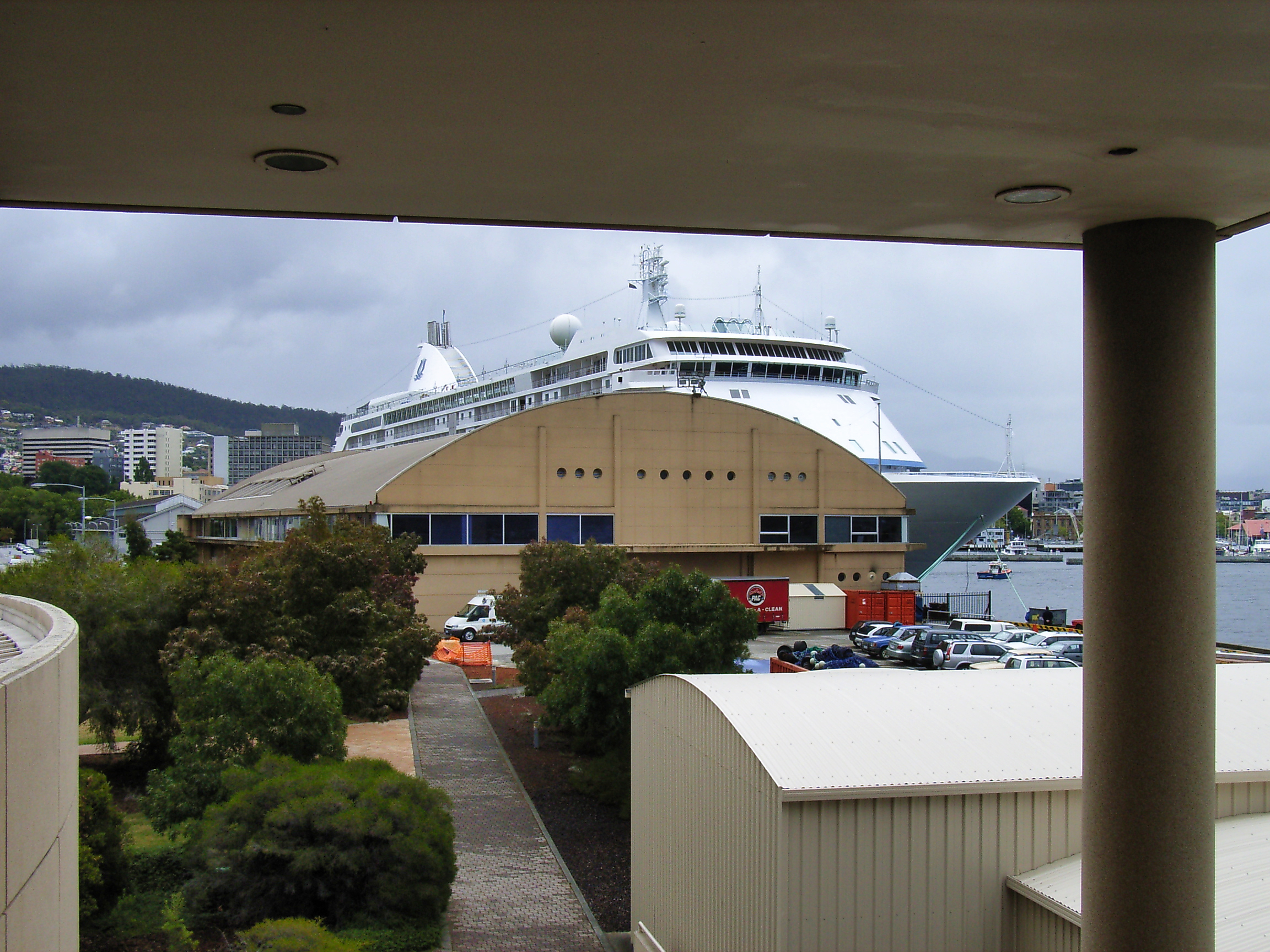
CSIRO Marine Laboratories, Hobart Block 1, February 2005

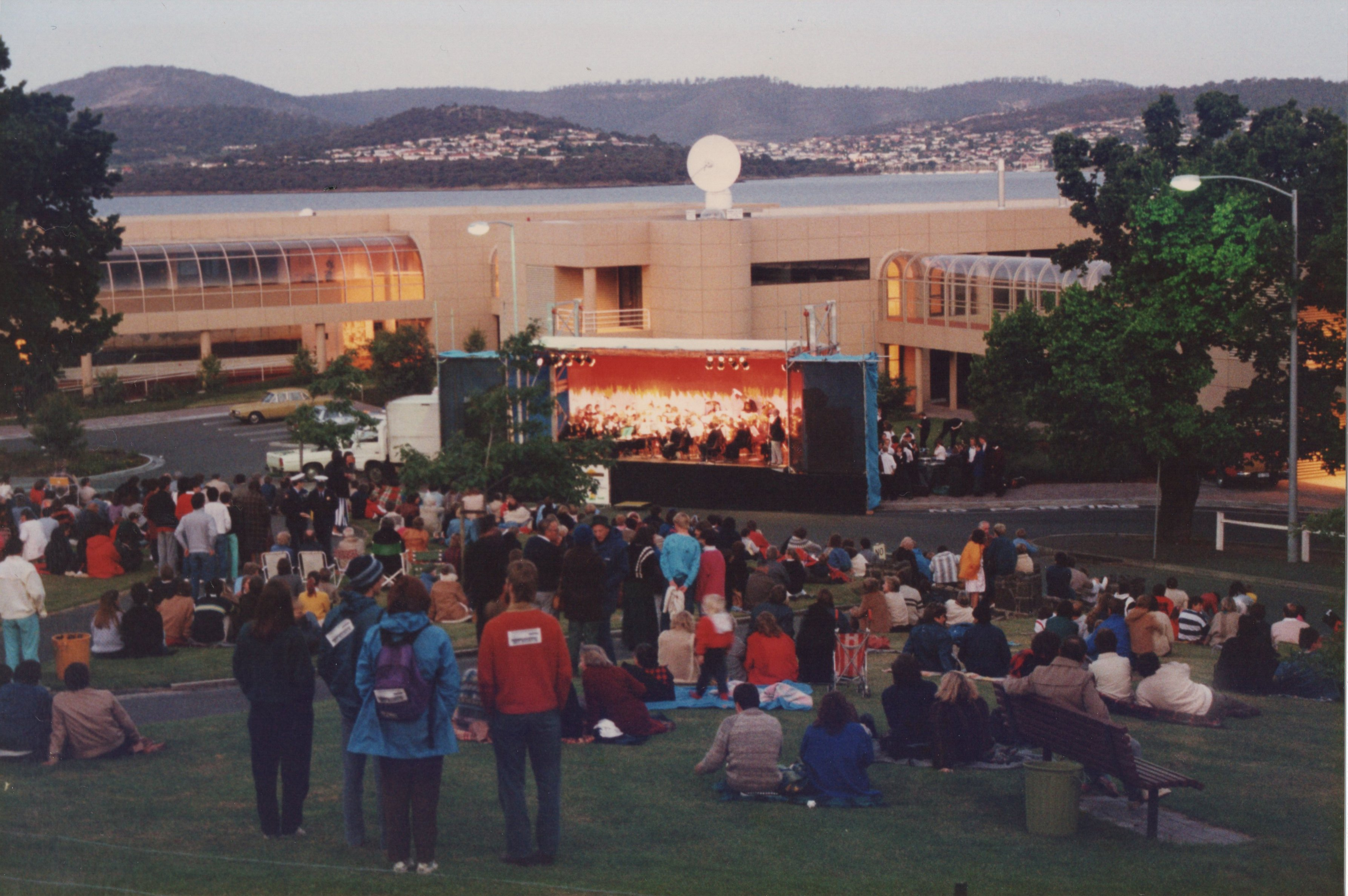
Concert opposite CSIRO Marine Laboratories, December 1986

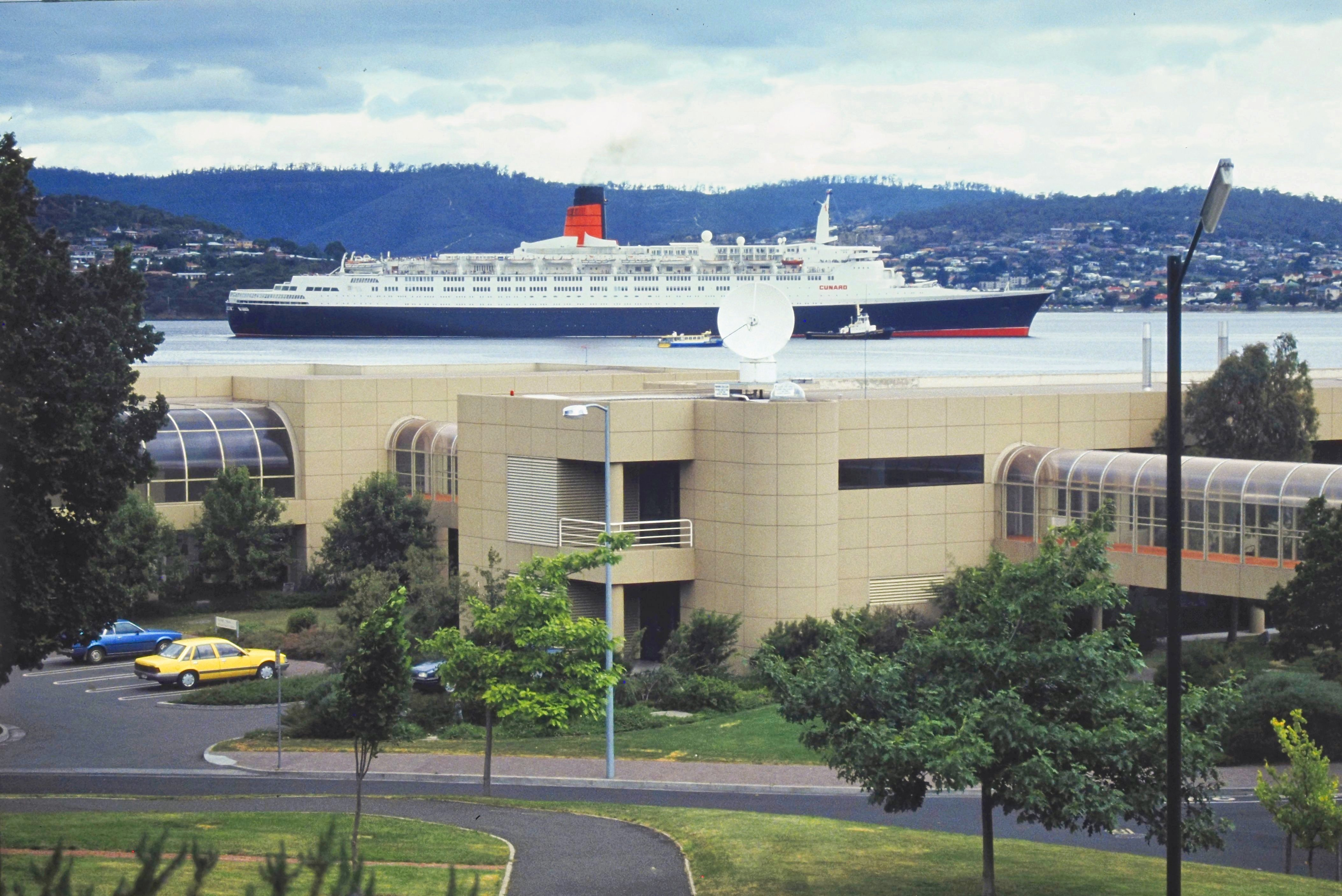
"Queen Elizabeth 2" (ship) in the Derwent River, Tasmania, early 1990s

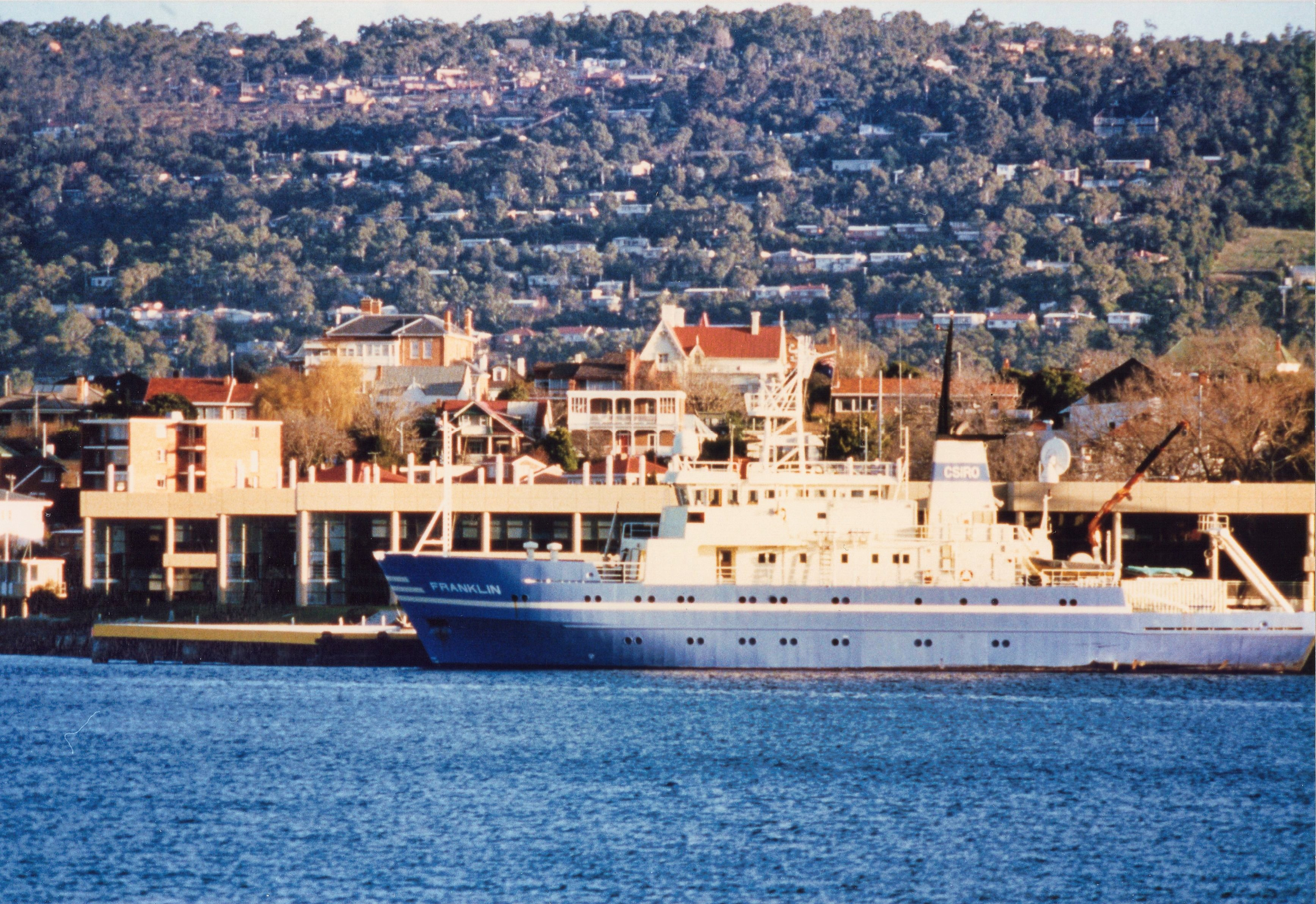
RV Franklin at CSIRO Marine Laboratories, Hobart, 1987

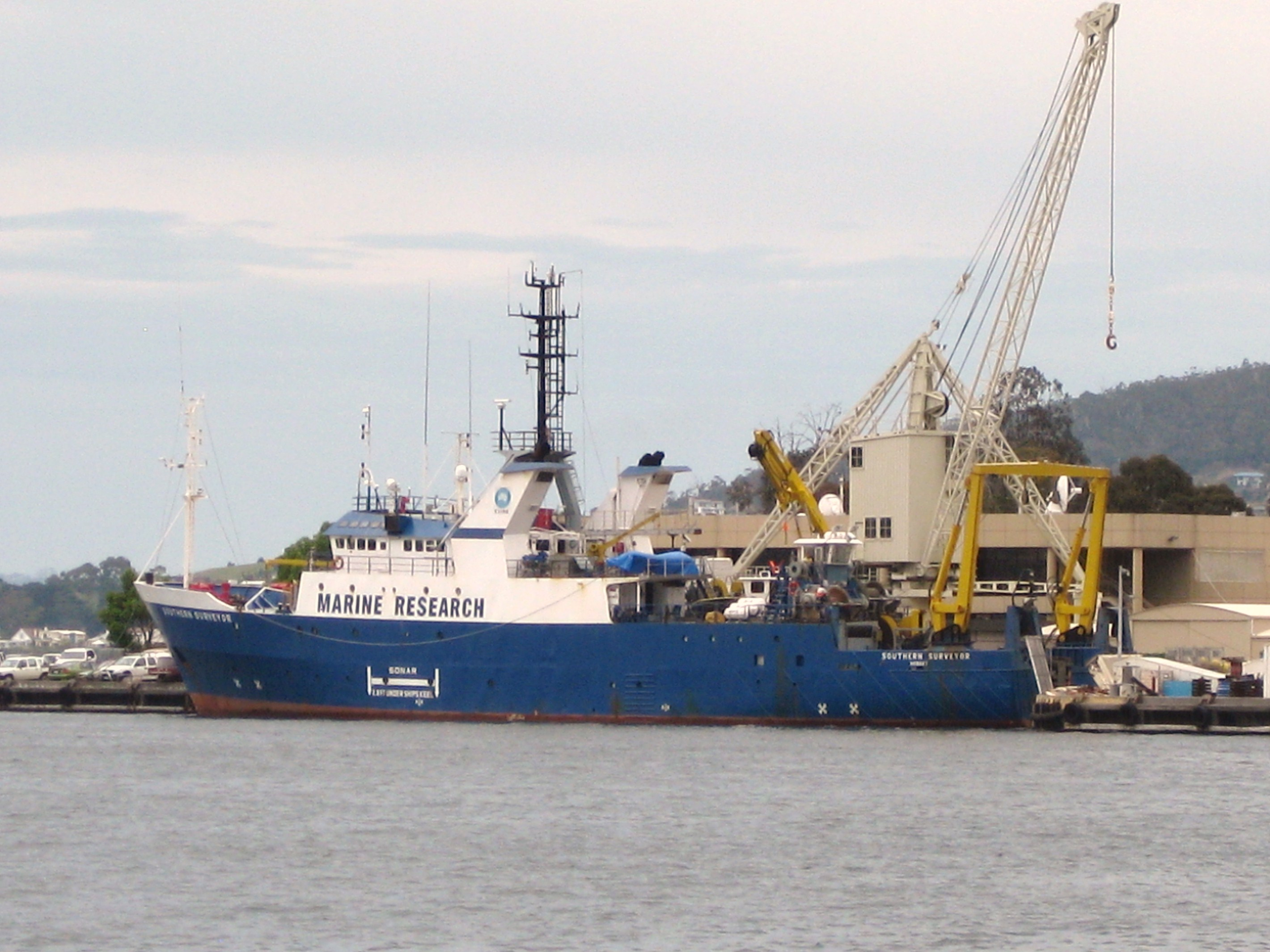
RV Southern Surveyor at the CSIRO wharf, November 2010

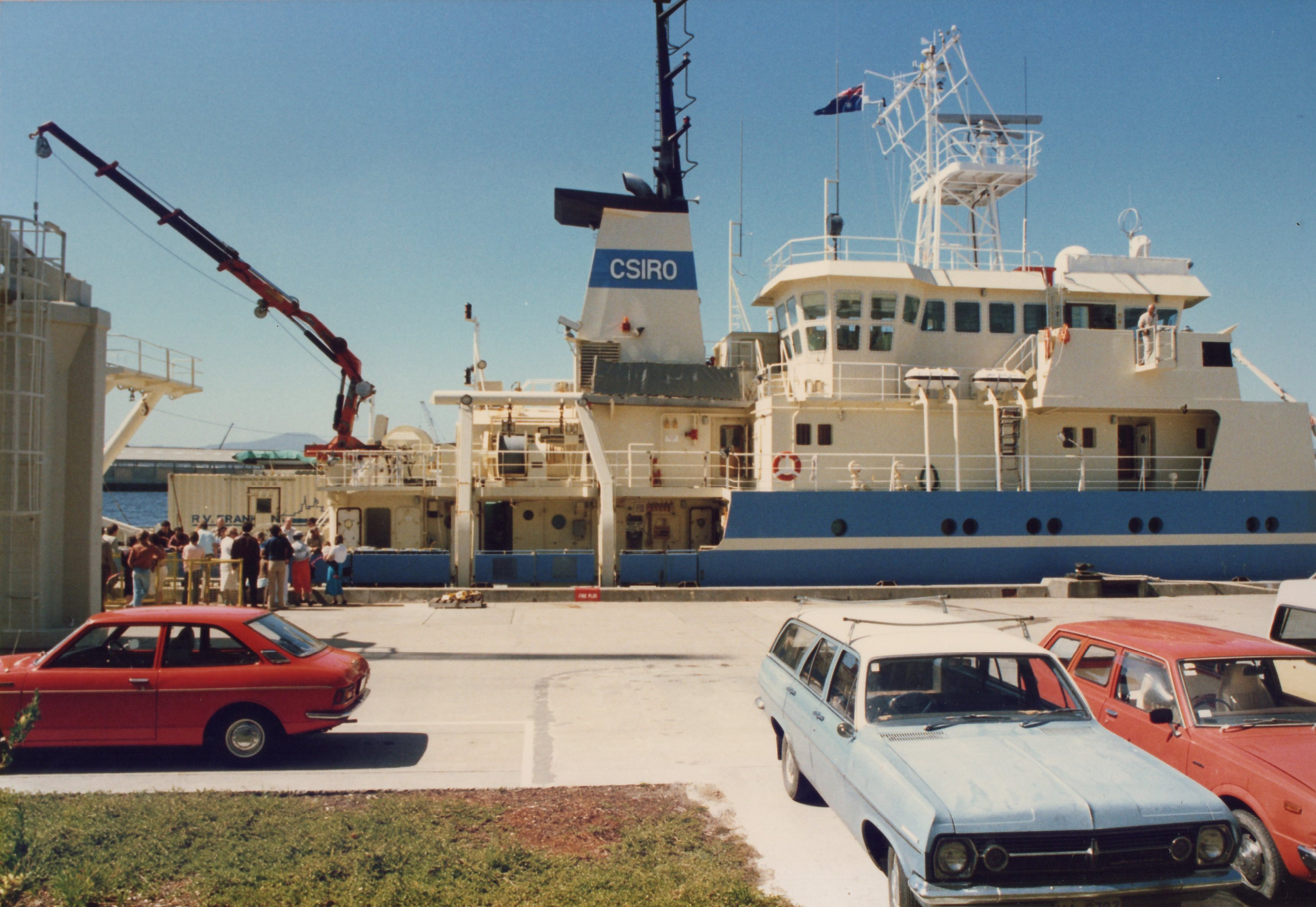
Australian Research Vessel RV Franklin at the CSIRO wharf, late 1986

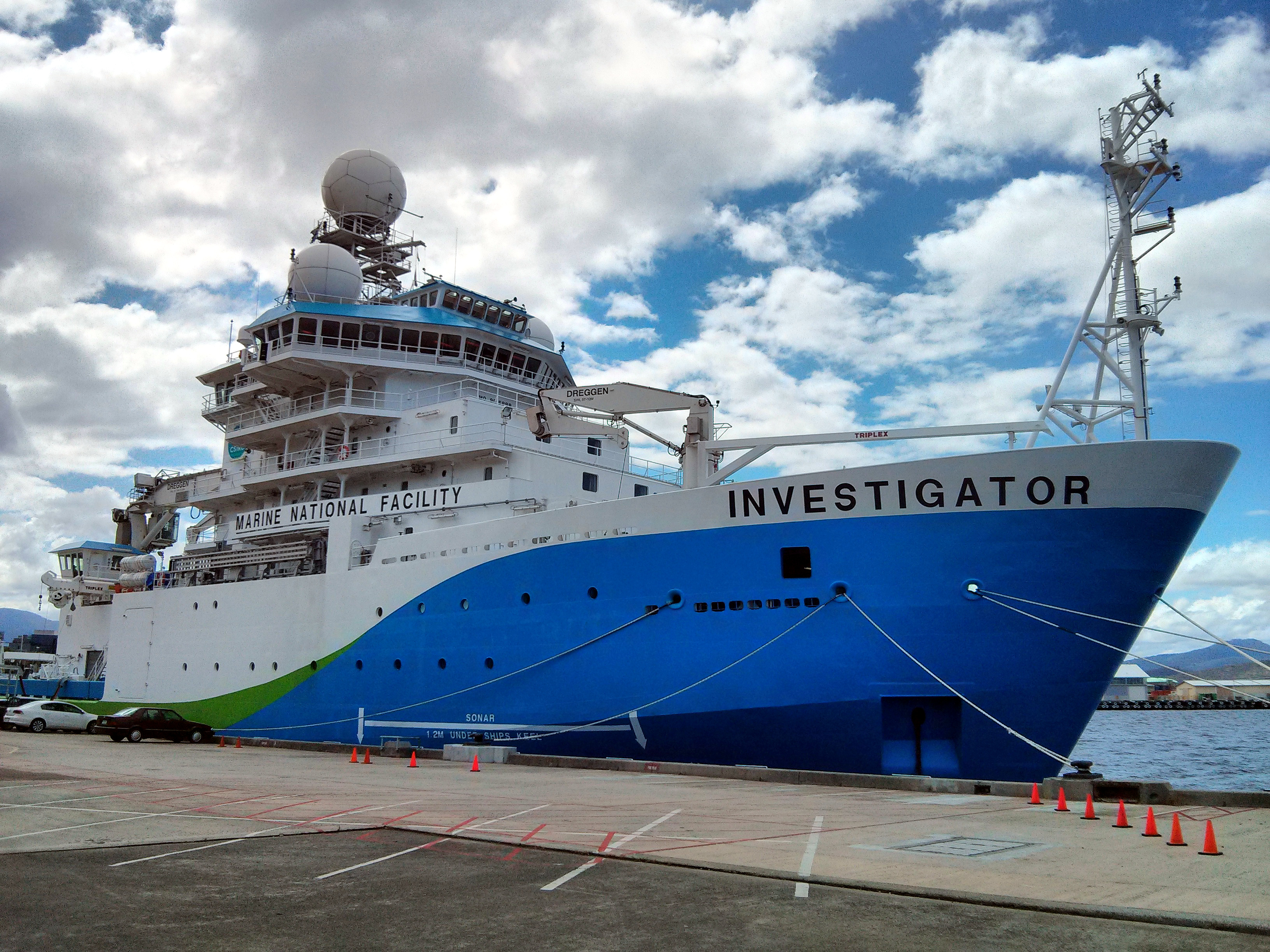
RV Investigator at the CSIRO wharf, 2015

== See also ==
- CSIRO
- CSIRO Oceans and Atmosphere
- RV Investigator
- RV Southern Surveyor
- RV Franklin (subsequently "Northern Franklin")
- Battery Point
