= CSIRO Division of Atmospheric Research =

Former Australian government funded science research organisation

- Abbreviation: DAR
- Formation: 1983
- Dissolved: 2005
- Type: Research division
- Headquarters: Aspendale, Victoria
- Coordinates: 38°1′30″S 145°6′6″E
- Fields: Atmospheric Research
- Parent organization: CSIRO | Commonwealth Scientific and Industrial Research Organisation
- Website: https://research.csiro.au

CSIRO Division of Atmospheric Research (DAR) (1983–2005) was a research section (Division) of the CSIRO, Australia's largest government-supported science research agency. In 2005 the Division was merged with CSIRO Marine Research to form CSIRO Marine and Atmospheric Research.

== Description and formation ==
The CSIRO Division of Atmospheric Research (abbreviation within CSIRO: DAR) was a Division of the CSIRO (Commonwealth Scientific Industrial and Research Organisation), Australia's national science research agency, in existence from 1983 to 2005. It was formed as a merger between the pre-existing Divisions of Atmospheric Physics and Cloud Physics, which between them had other forerunners including the Division of Meteorological Physics, Radiophysics, and the CSIRO Upper Atmosphere Section. It ceased to exist as a named entity (although its work was carried on) in 2005 when it merged with CSIRO Marine Research under the new name CSIRO Marine and Atmospheric Research. Its past activities are extensively documented in a 1998 publication by J. Garratt et al. The Division's climate modelling activities, 1981 to 2006, are described here. A 2026 ABC News article describes the 50-year air sampling program at Cape Grim, Tasmania, conducted by the Division jointly with the Bureau of Meteorology, and its significance.

== Location ==
Its facilities were located at Aspendale, Victoria and Canberra, ACT (CSIRO Black Mountain and Gungahlin sites).

== Staffing and budget ==
According to figures on the Division's website from June 1996, at that date the Division employed 145 science and support staff across its three locations. Its annual operating budget in 1998 was approximately around AUD$15 million.

== Activities ==
As at 1996, the Division's work was organised into four programs: Atmospheric Pollution; Atmospheric Processes; Climate Modelling; and Global Atmospheric Change. By 2005, the Division's work was organised into 4 Themes:

- Air Quality and Health
  - Air Pollutants: Sources, Modelling & Exposure
- Atmosphere and Earth Observation Theme
  - Greenhouse Gases: Observations & Modelling
  - COSSA/Earth Observation Centre and Global Carbon Project (AGO)
- Climate and Weather
  - Climate & Weather: Applications & Impacts
  - Climate Impact
- Complex Systems Science
- Land-Air Interactions
  - Coupled Carbon–Water Cycles
  - Wind Energy Research Unit

The Division operated the Cape Grim Baseline Air Pollution Station in a joint arrangement with the Australian Bureau of Meteorology. Over two decades of the Division's work in climate modelling provided critical data to the 2014 Intergovernmental Panel on Climate Change (IPCC) 5th Assessment Report that led to the ground-breaking Paris Agreement.

== Publications ==
A 2026 search on "Google Scholar" yields about 2,500 results (articles plus monographs) that include "CSIRO Division of Atmospheric Research" in the text, the majority comprising works authored by staff of the Division as primary or associate author.

== Divisional chiefs ==
Source: CSIROpedia

- 1983–92 Gilbert Brian Tucker
- 1992–95 Graeme Ivan Pearman
- 1995–96 Brian Lewis Sawford (acting)
- 1996–2002 Graeme Ivan Pearman
- 2002–2005 Gregory Peter Ayers

From 2005 the Division ceased to exist, becoming a part of CSIRO Marine and Atmospheric Research.

== See also ==
- CSIRO
- CSIRO Marine and Atmospheric Research
- CSIRO Oceans and Atmosphere
