= CSIRO Marine and Atmospheric Research =

Former scientific research division of CSIRO

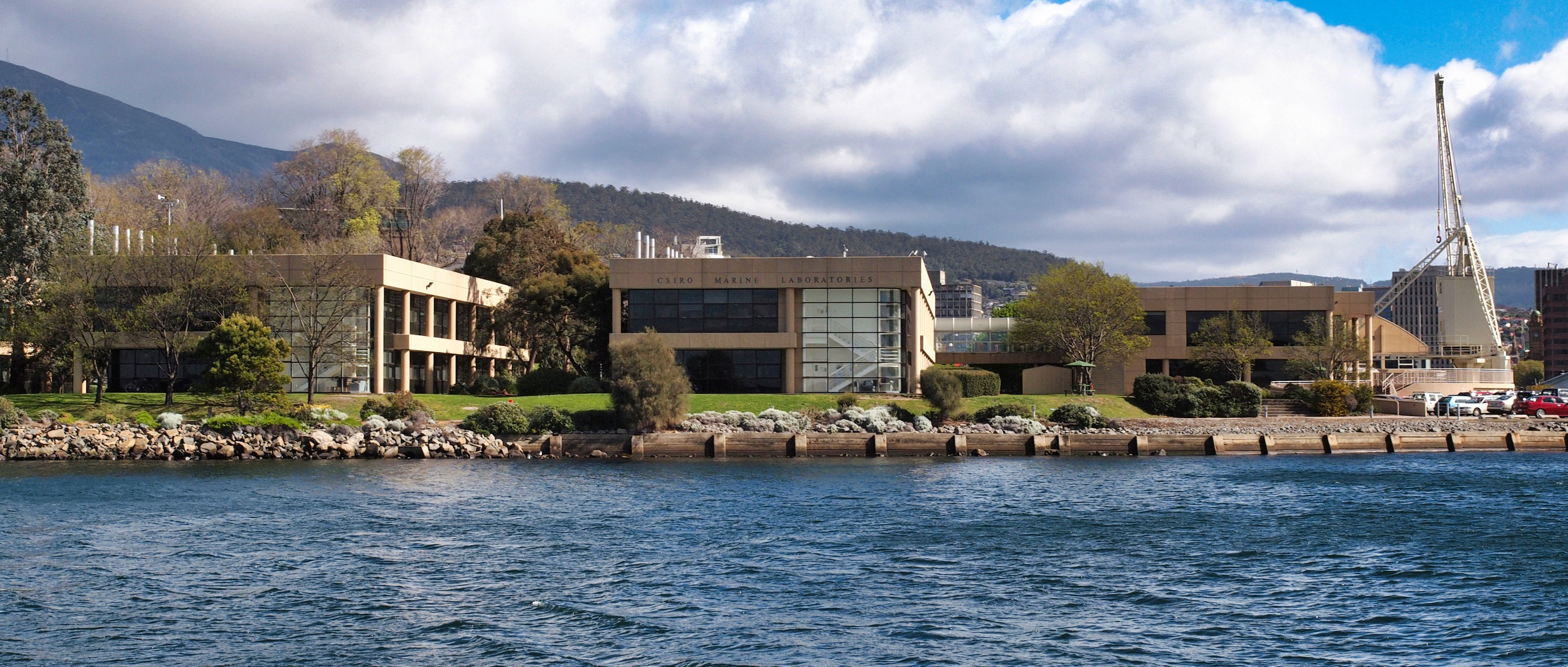
- Abbreviation: CMAR
- Formation: 2005
- Dissolved: 2014
- Type: Research division
- Headquarters: Hobart, Tasmania
- Coordinates: 42°53′14″S 147°20′19″E
- Fields: Marine Research, Atmospheric Research.
- Parent organization: CSIRO | Commonwealth Scientific and Industrial Research Organisation
- Website: https://research.csiro.au

CSIRO Marine and Atmospheric Research (CMAR) (2005–2014) was a research section (Division) of the CSIRO, Australia's largest government-supported science research agency. Its predecessors were the two separate CSIRO Divisions of Marine Research and Atmospheric Research. In 2014 the concept of Divisions was dropped in CSIRO and the Division became the Oceans and Atmosphere Business Unit.

== Description and formation ==
CSIRO Marine and Atmospheric Research (abbreviation within CSIRO: CMAR) was a Division of the CSIRO (Commonwealth Scientific Industrial and Research Organisation), Australia's national science research agency, in existence from 2005 to 2014. It was formed as a merger between the pre-existing Divisions of Marine Research and Atmospheric Research, both of which had long separate histories. It ceased to exist as a named entity (although its work was carried on) in 2014, when its name changed to the CSIRO Oceans and Atmosphere (O&A) Business Unit.

== Location ==
Its headquarters and the largest complement of its staff were based at the CSIRO Marine Laboratories in Hobart, Tasmania, while additional staff were located at Aspendale, Victoria; Canberra, ACT, being; Cleveland, Queensland (staff later relocated to Dutton Park); and Floreat, Western Australia.

== Staffing and budget ==
According to figures on the Division's website from July 2005, at that date the Division employed 540 science and support staff across its five locations. Its operating budget is not known at this time, although for comparison, in 1998 the annual operating budget for Marine Research was approximately AUD$35 million and for Atmospheric Research around AUD$15 million.

== Activities ==
As of 2005, the Division's work was organised into four themes: Coastal management, Climate, weather and ocean prediction, Atmospheric and earth systems assessment and prediction, and Sustainable marine resources and industries. By 2014, research was stated as being carried out under 9 headings:

- Atmosphere and land observation and assessment
- Climate variability and change
- Aquaculture genetics, nutrition and production
- Marine biogeochemistry
- Marine ecological processes and prediction
- Integrated marine and coastal assessment and management
- Weather and environmental prediction
- Earth system modelling
- Ocean observation, analysis and prediction

Ten items were listed under "Products and services", including a Specialised weather forecasting service; the Divisional Data Centre (supply of marine data dating back to the 1940s); and Satellite earth and ocean images: marine applications (coastal, ocean); while included under "Facilities" were the Australian National Fish Collection (ANFC), the Australian National Algae Culture Collection, Cape Grim Baseline Air Pollution Station, Tasmania, the Marine National Facility (see below), the Oceanographic Calibration Facility, and Satellite Remote Sensing (coastal, ocean).

The Division operated the research vessel RV Southern Surveyor as the Australian Marine National Facility (MNF) of the day with applications for sea time available by application from any Australian research institution, although by 2014 plans were under way for its replacement by a new vessel, the RV Investigator, at that time under construction.

In the mid 2000s, CMAR was actively involved in the formation of a virtual Australian Ocean Data Centre Joint Facility (AODCJF), a collaboration between six Australian Government agencies, namely the Australian Institute of Marine Science (AIMS), Australian Antarctic Division (AAD), Bureau of Meteorology (BOM), Geoscience Australia (GA) and Department of Defence (Royal Australian Navy Hydrography and Metoc Branch) in addition to CMAR. One result of this combined operation is the Australian Ocean Data Network (AODN) for which the public-facing interface is the AODN Data Portal, via which access to CMAR (now CSIRO Environment) marine data and that from other Australian marine agencies can be accessed in an integrated manner.

Also as part of national and international data sharing activities, building on previous technical collaboration with OBIS, the Ocean Biogeographic (later: Biodiversity) Information System, CMAR partnered with the then Australian Government National Oceans Office to provide an Australian Node for OBIS, (OBIS Australia); operation of OBIS Australia was subsequently moved to CMAR and its successors, where it is still active as at 2026, although the Marine Information and Data Centre which operates this OBIS Node has been since (2020) relocated within CSIRO from within "Oceans and Atmosphere" to CSIRO's more recently created National Collections and Marine Infrastructure Business Unit. Australian marine biodiversity digital data holdings assembled for OBIS Australia are also part of a broader data-sharing pipeline that was created as part of this initiative, with onward passage of data accessible to OBIS Australia data to the Atlas of Living Australia and ultimately to the Global Biodiversity Information Facility (GBIF).

== Publications ==
A 2026 search on "Google Scholar" yields about 10,800 results (articles plus monographs) that include "CSIRO Marine and Atmospheric Research" in the text, the majority comprising works authored by staff of the Division as primary or associate author.

== Divisional chiefs ==
Source: CSIROpedia

- 2005 Anthony Douglas John (Tony) Haymet
- 2005–08 Gregory Peter Ayers
- 2009–2014 Bruce David Mapstone

From 2014 the Division ceased to exist in a formal sense, becoming the Oceans and Atmosphere business unit.

== See also ==
- CSIRO
- CSIRO Oceans and Atmosphere
- RV Southern Surveyor
