= CSIRO Division of Oceanography =

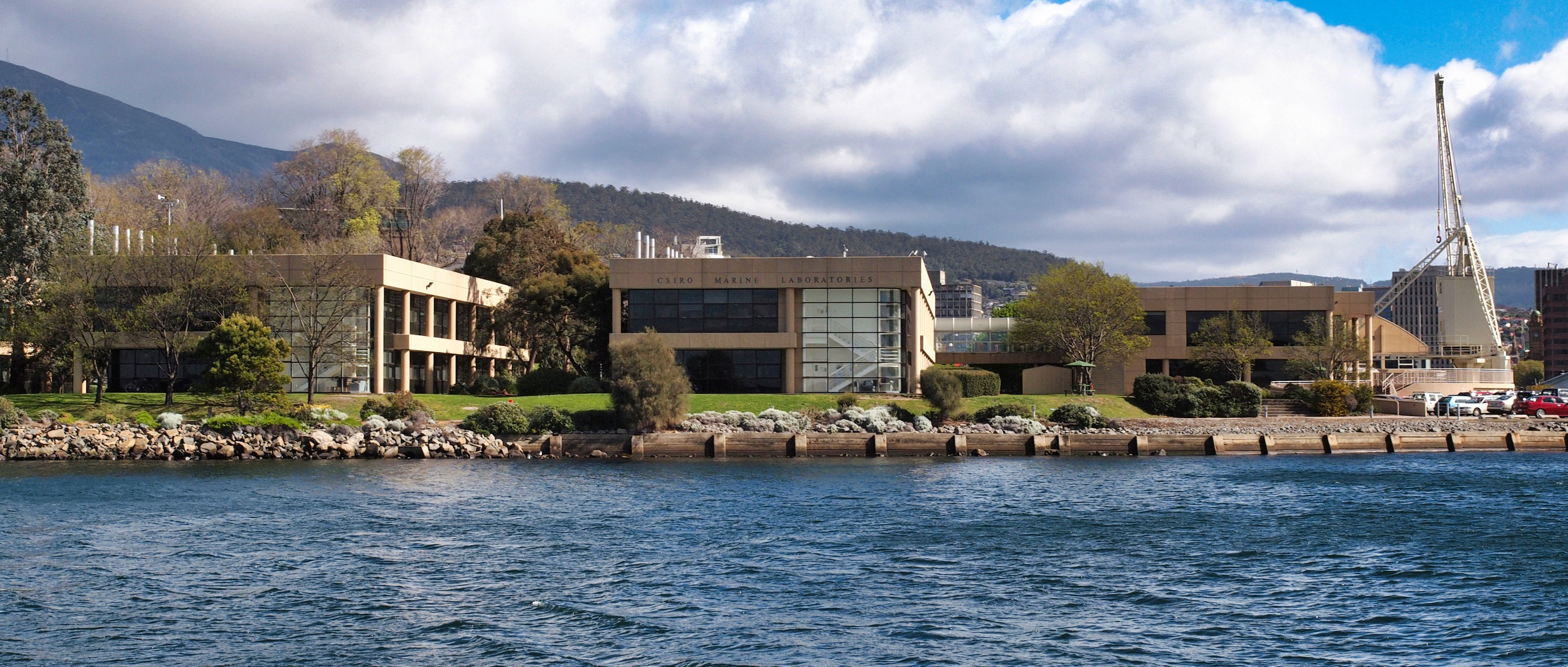
- Formation: 1981
- Dissolved: 1997
- Type: Research division
- Headquarters: Cronulla, New South Wales then Hobart, Tasmania
- Coordinates: 42°53′14″S 147°20′19″E
- Fields: Oceanographic Research
- Parent organization: CSIRO | Commonwealth Scientific and Industrial Research Organisation
- Website: https://research.csiro.au

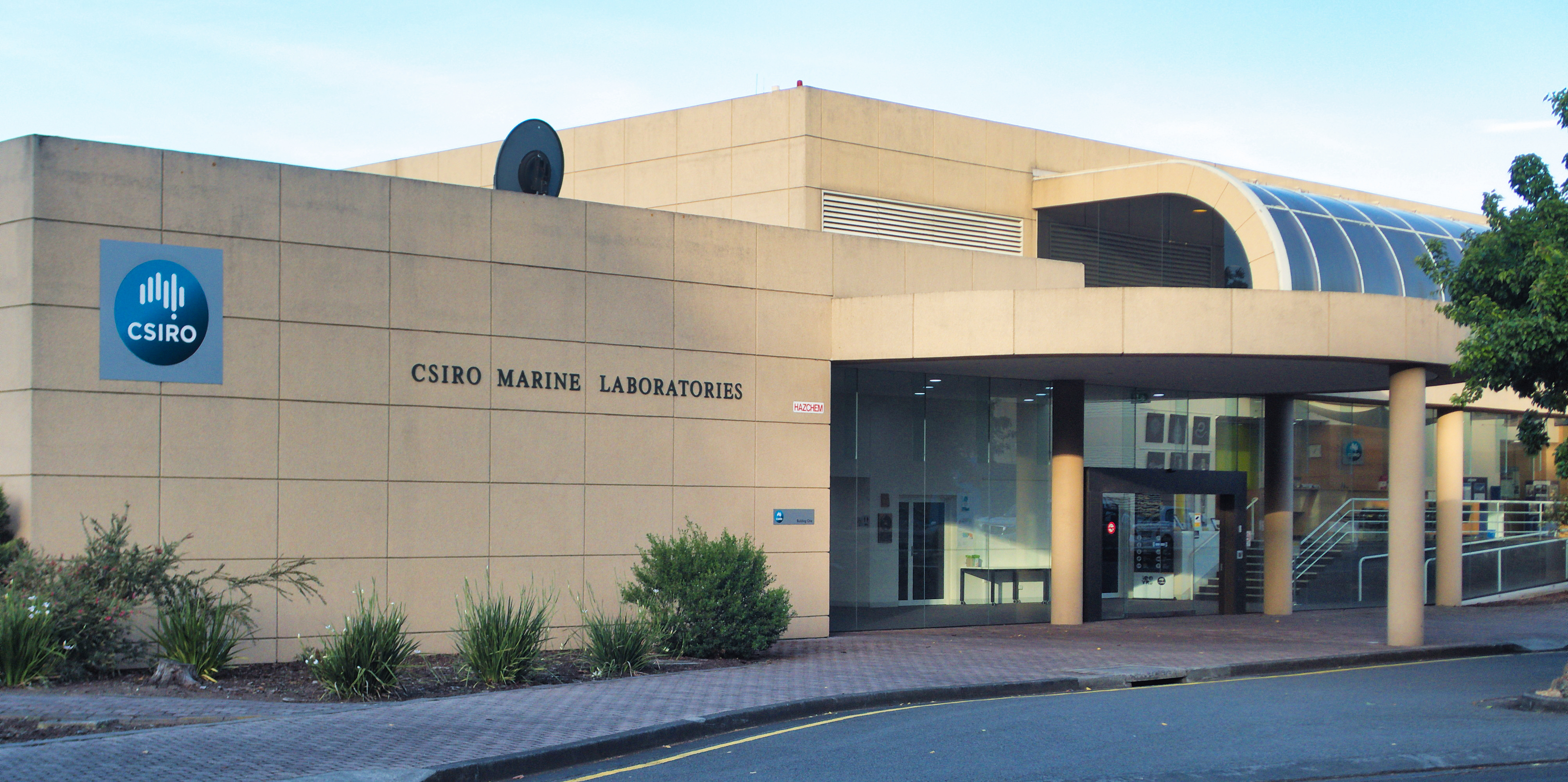
CSIRO Marine Laboratories, Hobart, home of the Division of Oceanography, 1984–1997.

The CSIRO Division of Oceanography (1981–1997) was a research section (Division) of the CSIRO (Commonwealth Scientific Industrial and Research Organisation), Australia's national science research agency. It was split from the previous CSIRO Division of Fisheries and Oceanography in 1981 and merged again with the same entity in 1997.

== Description and formation ==
The CSIRO Division of Oceanography was a Division of the CSIRO (Commonwealth Scientific Industrial and Research Organisation), Australia's national science research agency, in existence from 1981 to 1997. It was formed when the oceanographic component of marine science work previously conducted by the CSIRO Division of Fisheries and Oceanography was split off under a new name, with its own chief and budget allocation. It ceased to exist as a named entity (although its work was carried on) in 1997 when it was merged with the CSIRO Division of Fisheries under the new name CSIRO Marine Research.

Among its other activities it provided a home base (under separate funding) for the administration of the Marine National Facility in the form of the newly constructed oceanographic research vessel RV Franklin, which made its first science voyage in 1985.

== Location ==
Until c.1984 its staff were based in Cronulla, New South Wales; from that date the staff were transferred to new, purpose-built accommodation at the CSIRO Marine Laboratories in Hobart, Tasmania.

== Staffing and budget ==
According to figures quoted in Mawson et al., in 1987 the Division employed 62 research and technical staff and 19 support staff. In 1981-1982 its operating budget (from government sources) was AUD$3.5 million.

== Activities ==
As at 1991, the work of the Division was organised into four areas, namely Climate, Environment, Resources and Technology. By 1996 it had been reorganised under three areas: Climate and Ocean Processes; Marine Environment and Resources; and Regional Seas and the EEZ. Overviews of the principal activities of the Division in 1989 and 1991 (the latter from the perspective of a visiting U.S. Oceanography professor) are available..

== Publications ==
A 2026 search on "Google Scholar" yields about 1,200 results (articles plus monographs) that include [CSIRO] "Division of Oceanography" in the text, the majority comprising works authored by staff of the Division as primary or associate author.

== Divisional chiefs ==
Source: CSIROpedia

- 1981–95 Angus David McEwan
- 1995–97 Christoph Bruno Fandry

From 1997 the Division ceased to exist in a formal sense, being subsumed into CSIRO Marine Research (initial chief: Christoph Bruno Fandry).

== See also ==
- CSIRO
- CSIRO Marine Research
- RV Franklin
