= Graeme Pearman =

Australian scientist

Graeme Pearman AM (born 1941) was Chief of CSIRO Atmospheric Research in Australia from 1992 to 2002, and is an international expert on climate change. He left CSIRO in 2004 to establish his own consultancy company and take up a position with Monash University. He conducts briefings for the media, government, industry and environmental groups.

Pearman has published over 150 scientific papers. Major awards received include the CSIRO Medal in 1988 and the UNEP Global 500 Award in 1989. He was elected fellow of the Australian Academy of Science in 1989 and Fellow of the Royal Society of Victoria in 1997. He was made a Member of the Order of Australia in 1999, and received a Centenary Medal in 2001.

== See also ==
- Effects of global warming on Australia
- CSIRO Marine and Atmospheric Research
- Google Scholar search for author:GI-Pearman
