= RV Investigator =

Australian marine research vessel

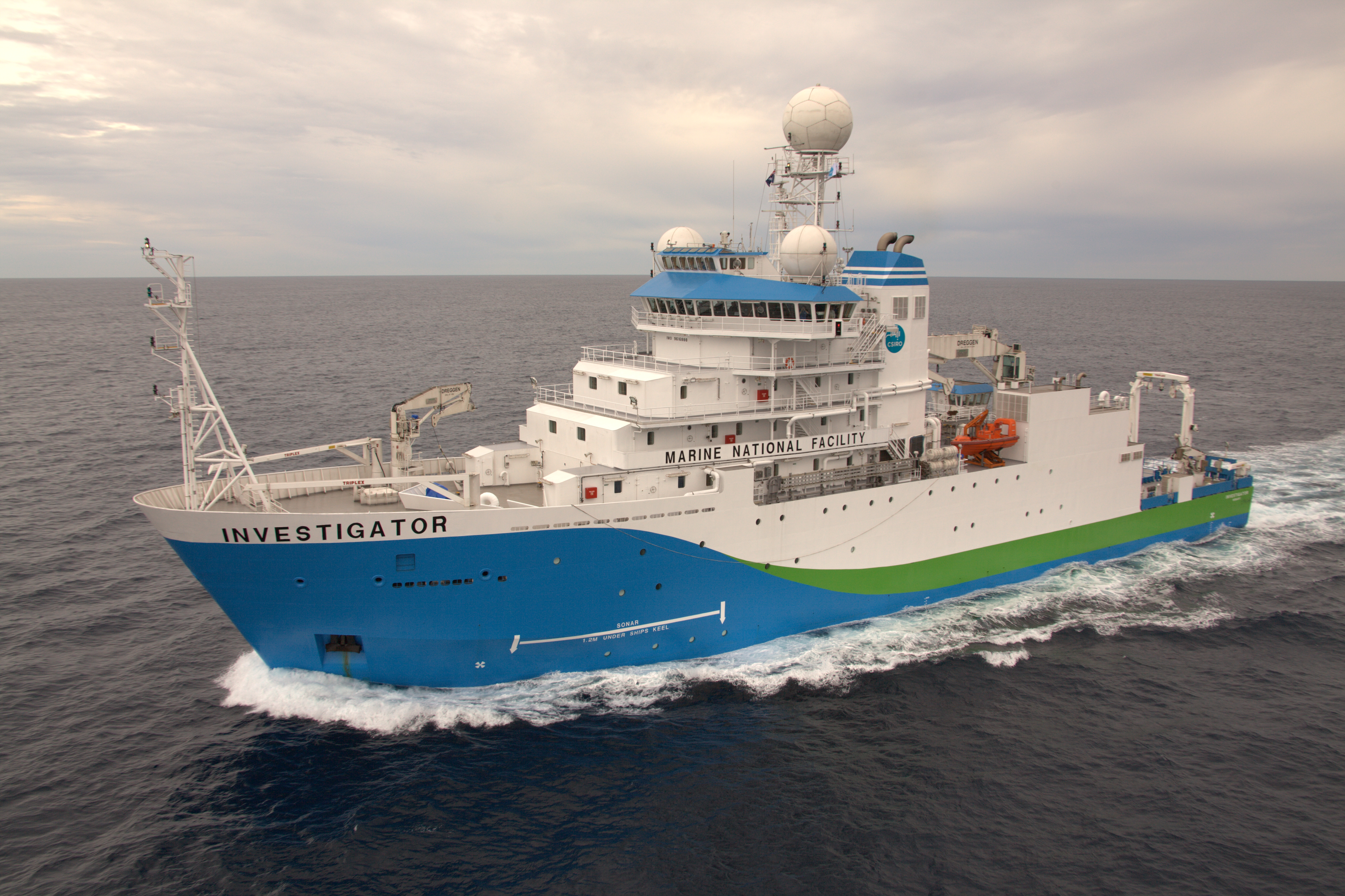

History

Australia
- Name: Investigator
- Namesake: HMS Investigator
- Owner: CSIRO
- Operator: CSIRO Marine National Facility
- Ordered: 2011
- Builder: Teekay Holdings Australia, Sembawang Shipyard, Singapore
- Acquired: September 2014
- Commissioned: 12 December 2014
- In service: From 2014
- Home port: Hobart, Tasmania, Australia
- Identification: IMO number: 9616888; MMSI number: 503791000; Callsign: VLMJ
- Status: Active

General characteristics
- Class & type: Oceanographic research ship
- Tonnage: 6082 GT, 1824 NT
- Length: 93.9 m (308 ft 1 in)
- Beam: 18.5 m (60 ft 8 in)
- Draught: 6.2 m (20 ft 4 in)
- Depth: 9.45 m (31 ft 0 in)
- Propulsion: Diesel Electric incorporating 3 x 9 Cylinder Diesel MaK 9M25C Generators (3000 kW each), 2 reversible electric propulsion motors (2600 kW each) driving two slow-speed fixed-pitch propellers, 1 electric retractable azimuth bow thruster (1200 kW).
- Speed: 12kts
- Range: 10,000 nautical miles (19,000 km), 60 days
- Complement: 18-20 crew, up to 40 scientists
- Notes: Technical and Crew Managers: MMA Offshore Limited

RV Investigator is an Australian marine research vessel owned by the CSIRO and operated by its Marine National Facility, undertaking oceanographic, geoscience, ecosystem and fisheries research.

In May 2009 the Government of Australia allocated $120 million for a new ocean-going research vessel to replace the 1972 built RV Southern Surveyor, which had served as the principal research ship for Australia's Marine National Facility since 1988. RV Investigator was designed by RALion (joint venture between Robert Allan Limited and Alion Science & Technology) and constructed in Singapore. It was transferred from Sembawang Shipyard to the delivery crew on 5 August 2014 for pre-departure testing and setup. The vessel arrived at its home port of Hobart on 9 September 2014 and was officially launched on 12 December 2014.

== Specifications ==
The RV Investigator is able to accommodate up to 40 scientists, go to sea for up to 60 days at a time and spend up to 300 days of the year at sea on research voyages. Operating costs are estimated to be $140,000 per day. Special features of the ship are a "gondola", similar to a winged keel, mounted 1.2 m below the hull, and two drop keels (which can be lowered to a maximum of 4m below the hull), to carry scientific instruments below the layer of microbubbles created by the movement of the ship’s hull through the water. Such instrumentation includes acoustic mappers, a pelagic sediment profiler to produce maps of the sea floor, and 2 Acoustic Doppler current profilers. The hull and the machinery of the ship have been designed to operate as quietly as possible to enhance its scientific capabilities.

== Notable works ==
In November 2020, the RV Investigator front camera captured a green meteor entering the atmosphere and produced a clear video of this rare phenomenon. The meteor footage was captured off the southern coast of Tasmania.
