= Northern Franklin =

Research ship built in 1985

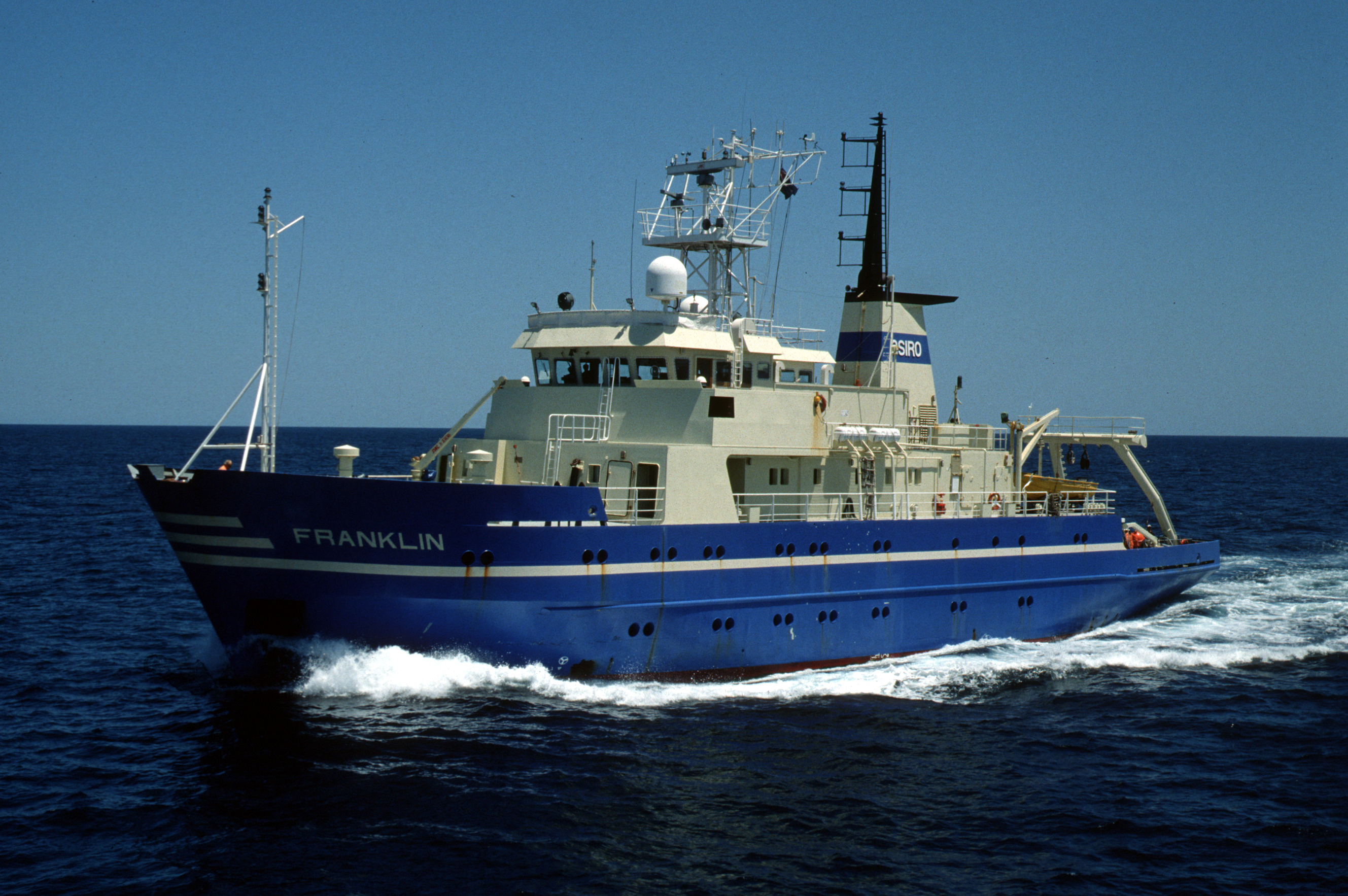
- Franklin underway in 2000

History

Australia
- Name: Northern Franklin
- Builder: NQEA, Cairns
- Yard number: 110
- Launched: 1985
- Completed: March 1985
- Identification: IMO number: 8301797; MMSI number: 231781000
- Name: Franklin
- Port of registry: Faroe Islands (2011–); Sweden (??–2011)
- Identification: Call sign: OZ2102 (2011–); Call sign: SEIN (??–2011)

General characteristics
- Tonnage: 1,178 tons
- Length: 55.61 m (182 ft 5 in)
- Beam: 11.99 m (39 ft 4 in)
- Draught: 3.8 m (12 ft 6 in)

Northern Franklin, formerly RV Franklin, is an oceanographic and hydrographic research vessel built by NQEA in Cairns, Queensland, Australia for the CSIRO in 1984 for surveys around Australia. Since 2005 it has operated in European waters by the marine survey operator MMT, based in Sweden.

== History ==
RV Franklin was constructed in Cairns, Queensland from 1983–1985 at a reported cost of AU$12.2 million and was operated by CSIRO as Australia's first Marine National Facility (MNF). It undertook 180 MNF voyages in the Australian region and in the Southern Ocean between 1985 and 2002.

In 2003, Franklin was replaced as the Marine National Facility by the Southern Surveyor and sold to a group of northern hemisphere private investors, who sold it in 2005 to European marine survey operator MMT, based in Sweden. MMT subsequently became part of Ocean Infinity.

As at 2025, the vessel continues to operate in the northern hemisphere for marine survey work, under the name Northern Franklin; its operations are run via the company Northern Survey by arrangement with MMT, sailing under the flag of Denmark.

== Science data access ==
Access to science data from 180 MNF-associated voyages of the Franklin is provided via the "Data Trawler" application of the CSIRO NCMI (National Collections and Marine Infrastructure) Information and Data Centre.
