= Greg Ayers =

Australian atmospheric scientist

Director of the Australian Bureau of Meteorology
- In office March 2009 – February 2012

Personal details
- Education: Monash University
- Occupation: Meteorologist, public servant

Greg Ayers is an Australian atmospheric scientist and was Director of the Australian Bureau of Meteorology from March 2009 until February 2012, when he resigned due to ill health.

Prior to his working at the Bureau of Meteorology, Ayers was Chief of Marine and Atmospheric Research at the CSIRO, where he had worked since 1975. Ayers is a Fellow of the Australian Academy of Technological Sciences and Engineering.

He was educated at Monash University, where he obtained a Bachelor of Science (with honours) and a PhD.

In February 2011 he responded to Cardinal George Pell's scepticism and ignorance about climate change during a Senate Estimates hearing.

He serves as the current chairman of the advisory board of the Australian National Computational Infrastructure (NCI), appointed in 2020
