= RV Southern Surveyor =

Australian research ship

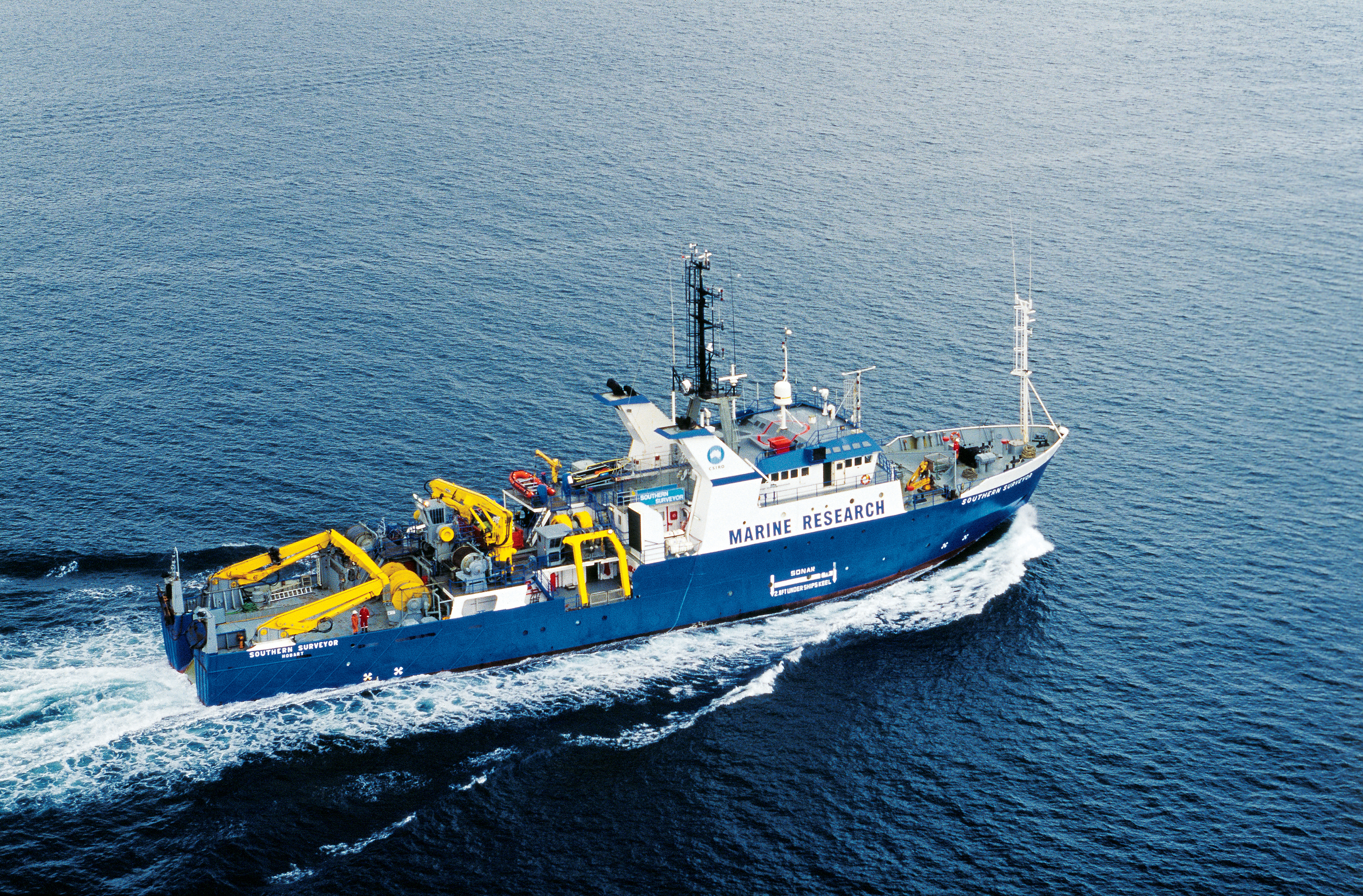
- Southern Surveyor at sea in 2010

History

Australia
- Name: Southern Surveyor
- Owner: CSIRO
- Operator: CSIRO
- Builder: Brooke Marine, Lowestoft, 1972; refitted by Launceston Marine Industries 1988; re-engined in Fremantle 1994
- Launched: 24 June 1971
- Acquired: 1988
- Decommissioned: 2014
- Identification: IMO number: 7113002, Lloyds Register 100A1 LMC UMS
- Fate: Sold 2014

General characteristics
- Class & type: Oceanographic research ship
- Tonnage: 1,594 GT
- Length: 66.1 m (216 ft 10 in)
- Beam: 12.3 m (40 ft 4 in)
- Draught: 5.3 m (17 ft 5 in)
- Propulsion: Escher WYSS, controllable pitch
- Speed: 11 knots (20 km/h; 13 mph) (cruising), 14 knots (26 km/h; 16 mph) (maximum)
- Range: 26 days at 11 knots

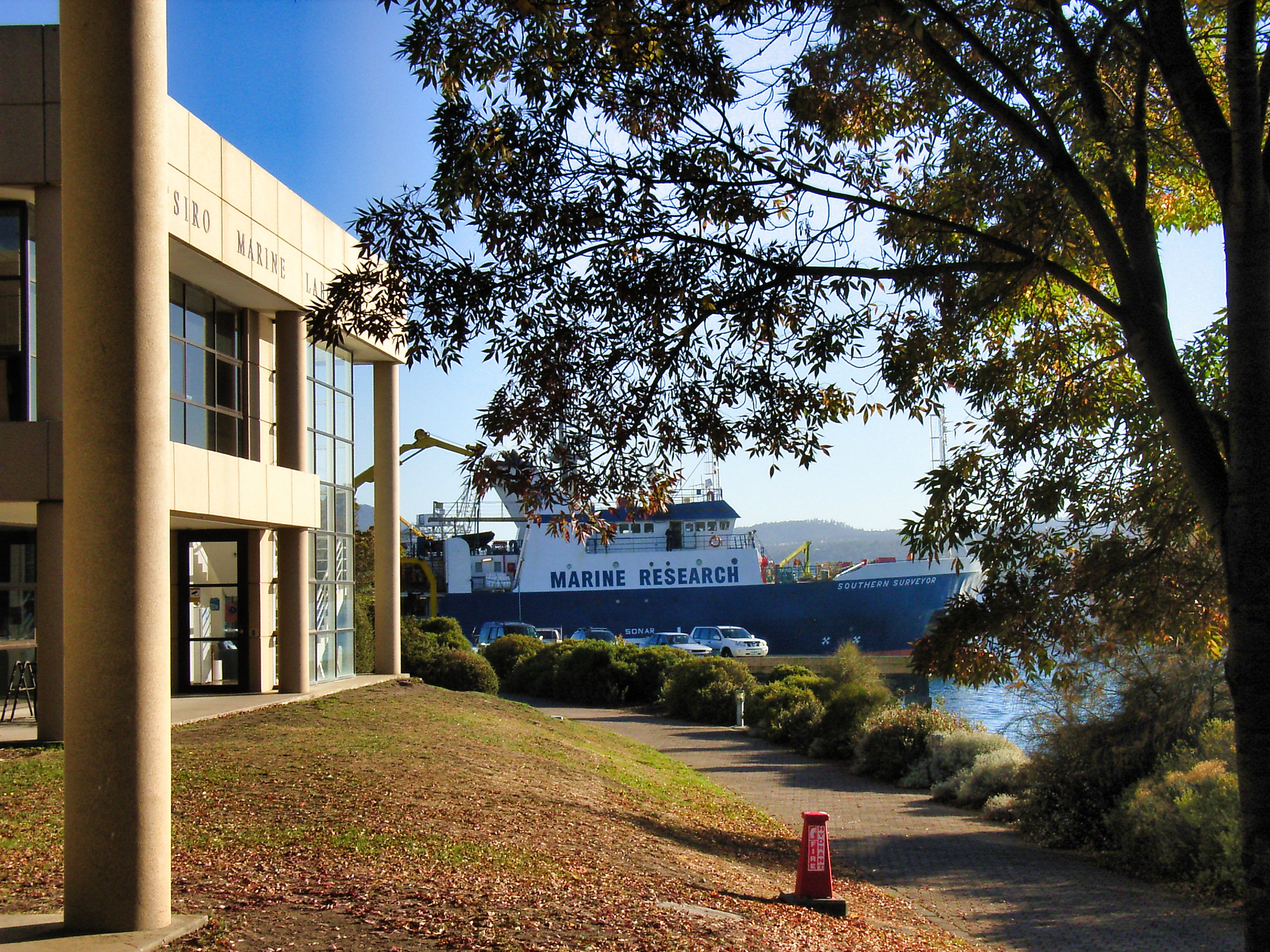
Southern Surveyor leaving its home base at CSIRO Marine Laboratories, Hobart, March 2008

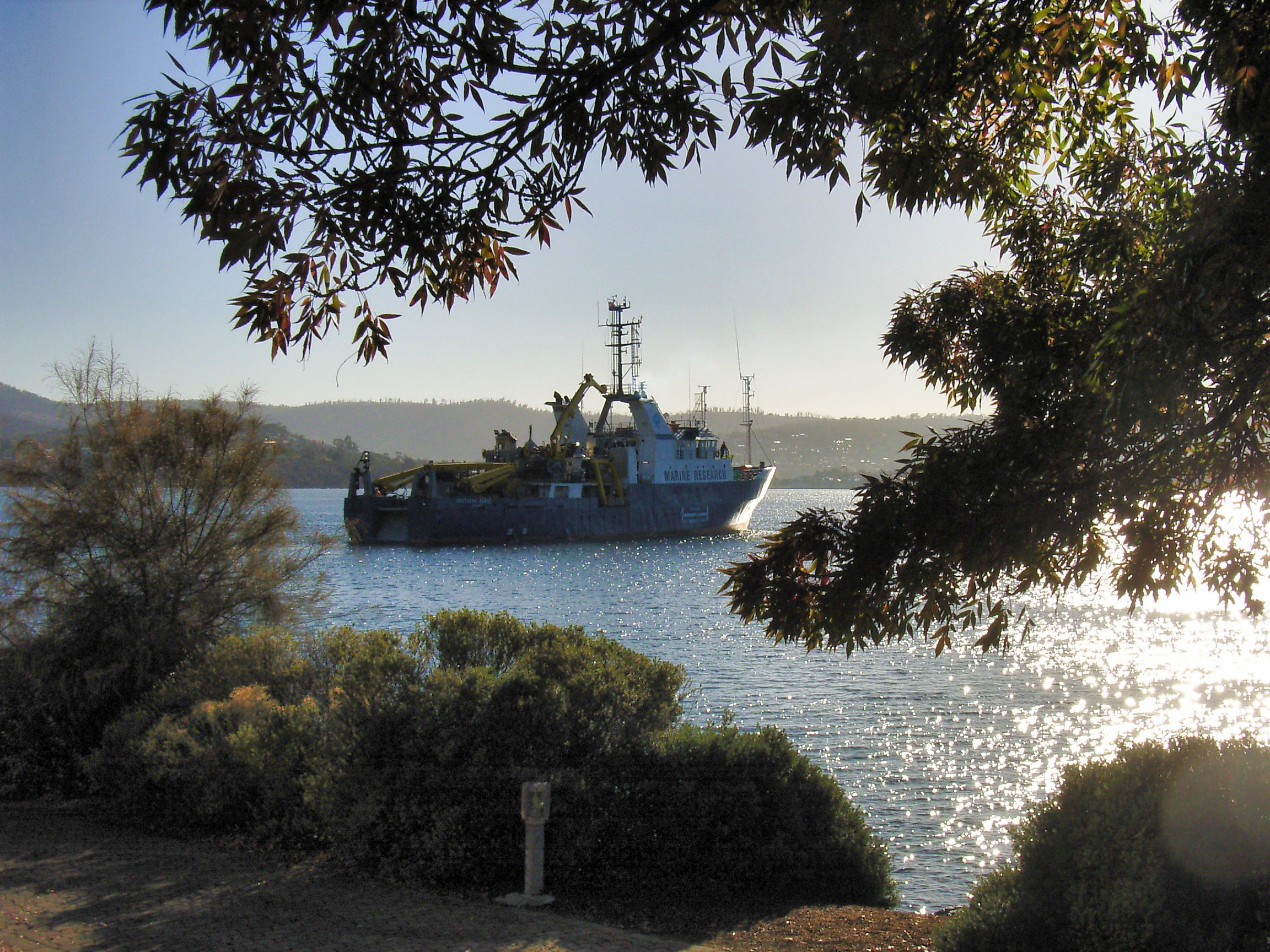
Southern Surveyor in the River Derwent, Hobart, March 2008

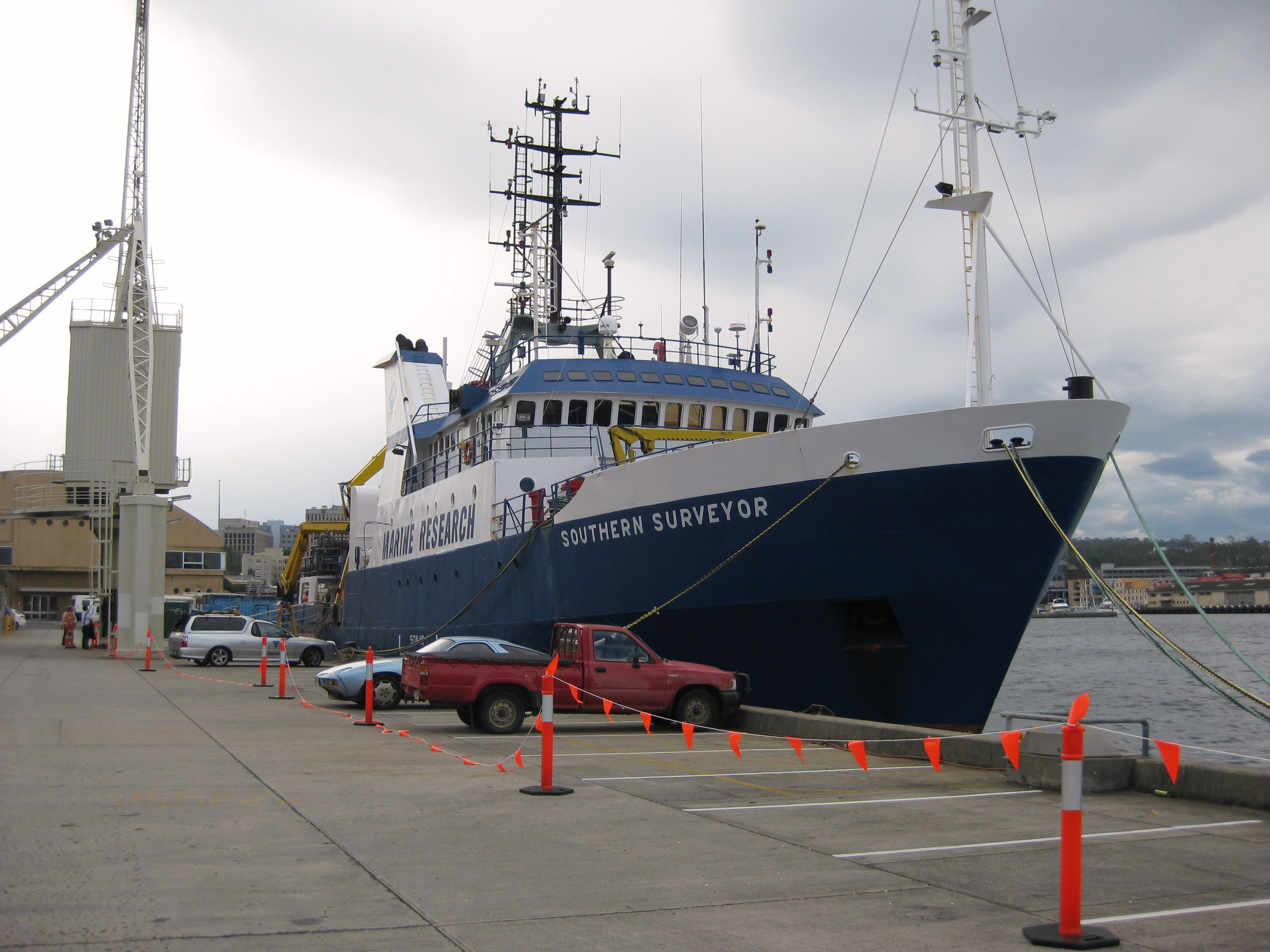
Southern Surveyor at the CSIRO wharf, Hobart, November 2010

RV Southern Surveyor was an Australian marine research vessel. It was owned and managed by the CSIRO to undertake oceanographic, geoscience, ecosystem and fisheries research. It was built by Brooke Marine in Lowestoft, England in 1972 and acquired by the CSIRO in 1988. It was replaced in 2014 by the RV Investigator.

== Achievements ==
The ship carried out 111 Marine National Facility research voyages, in the course of which she travelled 481,550 kilometres, in addition to some 90 for CSIRO Division of Fisheries Research/Fisheries in the period before it was operated as the National Facility, from 1990 to 2003. Achievements include the discovery of submarine volcanoes between Fiji and Samoa, the compilation of climate records from ancient corals, the production of a carbon chemistry map of the Great Barrier Reef, and the 2006 discovery of a 200 km diameter vortex in the waters above the Perth Canyon off the coast of Rottnest Island.

In 2012 the Southern Surveyor confirmed the undiscovery of Sandy Island.

== Science data access ==
Access to science data from 203 voyages of the Southern Surveyor is provided via the "Data Trawler" application of the CSIRO NCMI (National Collections and Marine Infrastructure) Information and Data Centre.
