= Coral Sea stingaree =

Conservation status
- Least Concern (IUCN 3.1)

Scientific classification
- Kingdom: Animalia
- Phylum: Chordata
- Class: Chondrichthyes
- Subclass: Elasmobranchii
- Order: Myliobatiformes
- Family: Urolophidae
- Genus: Urolophus
- Species: U. piperatus

Binomial name
- Urolophus piperatus Séret & Last, 2003

Species of cartilaginous fish

The Coral Sea stingaree (Urolophus piperatus) is a little-known species of stingray in the family Urolophidae, found at a depth of 171–310 m (561–1,017 ft) around the edge of the continental shelf off northern Queensland. Growing to a length of 48 cm (19 in), this species has a diamond-shaped pectoral fin disc with a protruding snout and a skirt-shaped flap of skin between the nostrils. Its tail bears a low dorsal fin before the stinging spine and terminates in a short leaf-shaped caudal fin. Its upper surface is grayish or brownish, sometimes with tiny dark spots. The Coral Sea stingaree may represent two closely similar species, one large and one small. There is very little fishing activity within its range, and thus it has been listed under Least Concern by the International Union for Conservation of Nature (IUCN).

== Taxonomy ==
The first known specimens of the Coral Sea stingaree were collected during a series of exploratory research cruises conducted by France and Australia in the 1980s. It was known provisionally as Urolophis "sp. B" before being described by Bernard Séret and Peter Last in a 2003 issue of the scientific journal Cybium. Its specific epithet is derived from the Latin piper ("pepper"), in reference to its spotted pattern. The type specimen is an adult male 48 cm (19 in) long, collected from Marion Reef off Queensland by the RV Soela on November 23, 1985. The sandyback stingaree (U. bucculentus) and the patchwork stingaree (U. flavomosaicus) are close relatives of this species.

== Distribution and habitat ==
Endemic to northern Queensland, the range of the Coral Sea stingaree extends from Moreton Island northward to Cairns, and encompasses the Saumarez and Marion Reefs. This bottom-dwelling species is found on the outer continental shelf and upper continental slope, at a depth of 171–370 m (561–1,214 ft).

== Description ==
The Coral Sea stingaree has a diamond-shaped pectoral fin disc 113–121% wider than long, with nearly straight leading margins and rounded outer corners. The tip of the fleshy, triangular snout protrudes past the disc. The eyes are rather large, and are followed by teardrop-shaped spiracles with rounded to angular posterior rims. There is a skirt-shaped flap of skin between the nostrils, with a weakly fringed posterior margin whose corners are extended into small lobes. The medium is of medium size and contains 7–9 papillae (nipple-like structures) on the floor; the 5–7 papillae in the middle may have multiple tips. The lower jaw also bears a patch of minute papillae. The teeth number 32–35 rows in the upper jaw and 30–39 in the lower jaw, and are small with roughly rhomboid bases. The five pairs of gill slits are short. The pelvic fins are small and rounded posteriorly; males have blunt claspers.

The tail measures 76–85% as long as the disc and is flattened at the base; there may be a subtle skin fold running along each side. A serrated stinging spine is placed atop the tail about halfway along its length, with a low dorsal fin just in front. The tail ends in a short, deep, leaf-shaped caudal fin. The skin is devoid of dermal denticles. Rays found in the Coral Sea are generally light gray or brown above with tiny dark dots, while those off Queensland tend to be darker brown above and unpatterned. The dorsal and caudal fins are brown with blackish margins. Juveniles are usually more densely spotted than adults, and have a dark stripe along the dorsal midline of the tail. The underside is white, sometimes with dusky lateral disc margins and/or a few dark blotches on the tail. The largest known specimen is 48 cm (19 in) long.

== Biology and ecology ==
Virtually nothing is known of the natural history of the Coral Sea stingaree. It is presumably aplacental viviparous like other stingrays, with developing embryos provisioned with maternally produced histotroph ("uterine milk"). Newborns measure around 12 cm (4.7 in) long; the litter size is probably small based on related species. Males and females attain sexual maturity at under 23 cm (9.1 in) and 27 cm (11 in) long respectively. The disparity between the maturation size and the maximum size is usually large for a cartilaginous fish, and it is possible that the specimens currently identified as the Coral Sea stingaree actually represent distinct species, one large and one small. However, the presumed large and small forms cannot be distinguished by morphological or meristic traits.

== Human interactions ==
Because fishery activity is insignificant within the range of the Coral Sea stingaree, it has been listed under Least Concern by the International Union for Conservation of Nature (IUCN). It would potentially benefit from the implementation of the 2004 Australian National Plan of Action for the Conservation and Management of Sharks.
