= New Caledonian stingaree =

Conservation status
- Least Concern (IUCN 3.1)

Scientific classification
- Kingdom: Animalia
- Phylum: Chordata
- Class: Chondrichthyes
- Subclass: Elasmobranchii
- Order: Myliobatiformes
- Family: Urolophidae
- Genus: Urolophus
- Species: U. neocaledoniensis

Binomial name
- Urolophus neocaledoniensis Séret & Last, 2003

Species of cartilaginous fish

The New Caledonian stingaree (Urolophus neocaledoniensis) is a little-known species of stingray in the family Urolophidae, found off New Caledonia and the adjacent Chesterfield Islands and Norfolk Ridge. This species reaches 37 cm (15 in) long and has a rounded, diamond-shaped pectoral fin disc slightly wider than long. There is a skirt-shaped curtain of skin between its nostrils. Its tail is fairly long, lacks a dorsal fin, and ends in a leaf-shaped caudal fin; some individuals also bear slight lateral skin folds on the tail. The International Union for Conservation of Nature (IUCN) has listed the New Caledonian stingaree under Least Concern, as it faces no substantial fishery threats.

== Taxonomy ==
Named for the center of its distribution, the New Caledonian stingaree was described by Bernard Séret and Peter Last in a 2003 issue of the scientific journal Cybium. The first specimens were caught during research cruises undertaken in the Coral Sea by France and Australia in the 1990s; a 40 cm (16 in) long male, collected from the Chesterfield Islands by the research vessel Coriolis, was designated as the holotype. This species is closely related to the Chesterfield Island stingaree (U. deforgesi), and also bears morphological similarities to the mitotic stingaree (U. mitosis).

== Distribution and habitat ==
The most abundant and widespread stingaree in the New Caledonian region, the New Caledonian stingaree is found around New Caledonia itself as well as off the Chesterfield Islands to the northwest and the northern portion of the Norfolk Ridge to the southeast. This benthic species has been recorded from depths of 229–428 m (751–1,404 ft).

== Description ==
The New Caledonian stingaree has a rhomboid pectoral fin disc 102–115% as wide as long, with broadly rounded outer corners and strongly convex anterior margins. The snout is fleshy and broad, with a protruding tip. The eyes are of medium size and immediately followed by comma-shaped spiracles. Between the nostrils is a skirt-shaped curtain of skin with a subtly fringed posterior margin. The mouth is modestly sized and bears 7–10 papillae (nipple-shaped structures) on the floor, arranged in a "W". There is also a patch of small papillae on the outside of the lower jaw. The teeth number 27–34 rows in the upper jaw and 24–31 rows in the lower jaw. The five pairs of gill slits are short. The pelvic fins are small with rounded margins; males have very thick claspers with rounded tips.

The tail is fairly long, measuring 68–79% as long as the disc, and tapers rapidly past the serrated stinging spine placed on the upper surface about halfway along its length. There is no dorsal fin, but there may be a subtle fold of skin running along either side of the tail. The terminal leaf-shaped caudal fin is short and deep. The skin is completely smooth. This species is a uniform grayish brown to olive brown above; the underside is whitish, with a broad dusky band along the lateral and posterior disc margins. The margins of the pelvic, dorsal, and caudal fins, and the tip of the snout, are dark; this is more obvious in juveniles. The largest known specimen measured 37 cm (15 in) long.

== Biology and ecology ==
Little is known of the New Caledonian stingaree's natural history. It is presumed to be aplacental viviparous, bearing small litters, like other members of its family. Newborns measure roughly 13 cm (5.1 in) long; males attain sexual maturity at roughly 30 cm (12 in) long.

== Human interactions ==
Because there are no commercial trawl fisheries operating within the range of the New Caledonian stingaree, the International Union for Conservation of Nature (IUCN) has listed it under Least Concern.
