= Chesterfield Island stingaree =

Conservation status
- Least Concern (IUCN 3.1)

Scientific classification
- Kingdom: Animalia
- Phylum: Chordata
- Class: Chondrichthyes
- Subclass: Elasmobranchii
- Order: Myliobatiformes
- Family: Urolophidae
- Genus: Urolophus
- Species: U. deforgesi

Binomial name
- Urolophus deforgesi Séret & Last, 2003

Species of cartilaginous fish

The Chesterfield Island stingaree or Deforge's stingaree (Urolophus deforgesi) is a little-known species of stingray in the family Urolophidae, endemic to the continental slope off the Chesterfield Islands. Reaching 34 cm (13 in) long, it has a rounded, diamond-shaped pectoral fin disc colored plain brown above and pale below, with a short head. There is a narrow, skirt-shaped curtain of skin between its nostrils. Its tail is relatively long and terminates in a leaf-shaped caudal fin; there are no dorsal fin or lateral skin folds. This species has been listed under Least Concern by the International Union for Conservation of Nature (IUCN), as there is little fishing activity within its range.

== Taxonomy ==
The first known specimens of the Chesterfield Island stingaree were caught during a series of research cruises undertaken in the Coral Sea by France and Australia in the 1990s. The species was described by Bernard Séret and Peter Last in a 2003 issue of the scientific journal Cybium, and named for Institut de Recherche pour le Développement (IRD) scientist Bertrand Richer de Forges. The type specimen is a 32 cm (13 in) long adult male collected by the research vessel Coriolis. This species is closely related to the New Caledonian stingaree (U. neocaledoniensis), and also bears morphological similarities to the mitotic stingaree (U. mitosis).

== Distribution and habitat ==
The range of the Chesterfield Island stingaree is limited to the Chesterfield Islands, northwest of New Caledonia. This bottom-dwelling ray inhabits the continental slope over a depth range of 203–330 m (666–1,083 ft).

== Description ==
The pectoral fin disc of the Chesterfield Island stingaree is diamond-shaped and 109–122% as wide as long, with broadly rounded outer corners and gently convex leading margins. The snout is fleshy and forms an obtuse angle, with the tip slightly protruding. The eyes are medium-sized and somewhat closely spaced, and immediately followed by teardrop-shaped spiracles. There is a narrow, skirt-shaped curtain of skin between the nostrils, with a deeply fringed posterior margin and the posterior corners drawn out into lobes. The mouth is modestly sized and contains 7–8 papillae (nipple-like structures) on the floor, arranged in a "W"; there is also a patch of small papillae on the lower jaw. There are 28–33 upper tooth rows and 27–31 lower tooth rows. The five pairs of gill slits are short. The pelvic fins are small and rounded; males have slender, pointed claspers.

The tail is somewhat flattened and measures 77–84% as long as the disc. There is a single dorsally placed, serrated stinging spine around halfway along the tail, and no dorsal fin or lateral skin folds. The tail terminates in a long, low, leaf-shaped caudal fin. The skin is entirely devoid of dermal denticles. This species is plain yellowish brown above with a dark caudal fin margin, which is more obvious in juveniles. The underside is white to cream, darkening slightly at the fin margins. The largest known specimen is 34 cm (13 in) long.

== Biology and ecology ==
Little is known of the natural history of the Chesterfield Island stingaree. It is presumably aplacental viviparous with a small litter size, as in other members of its family. Newborns measure around 13 cm (5.1 in) long and males reach sexual maturity at under 29 cm (11 in) long.

== Human interactions ==
The International Union for Conservation of Nature (IUCN) has listed the Chesterfield Island stingaree under Least Concern, as no commercial trawl fishing occurs within its range.
