= Butterfly stingaree =

Conservation status
- Least Concern (IUCN 3.1)

Scientific classification
- Kingdom: Animalia
- Phylum: Chordata
- Class: Chondrichthyes
- Subclass: Elasmobranchii
- Order: Myliobatiformes
- Family: Urolophidae
- Genus: Urolophus
- Species: U. papilio

Binomial name
- Urolophus papilio Séret & Last, 2003

Species of cartilaginous fish

The butterfly stingaree (Urolophus papilio) is a little-known species of stingray in the family Urolophidae, endemic to the continental slope off the Chesterfield Islands. This species is characterized by a diamond-shaped pectoral fin disc much wider than long, and a rather short tail terminating in a leaf-shaped caudal fin, as well as bearing a dorsal fin and sometimes indistinct lateral skin folds. There is a skirt-shaped flap of skin between its nostrils. It is plain yellowish to brownish above, and reaches a length of at least 40 cm (16 in). The International Union for Conservation of Nature (IUCN) has listed this ray as of Least Concern, since no commercial trawl fishing occurs within its range.

== Taxonomy ==
The butterfly stingaree was described by Bernard Séret and Peter Last in a 2003 issue of the scientific journal Cybium; the specific epithet, "papilio" (Latin for "butterfly"), refers to its wide disc. The first known specimens were collected during a series of research cruises in the Coral Sea, conducted by France and Australia in the 1990s. An adult male 40 cm (16 in) long, trawled by the research vessel Coriolis, was designated as the holotype. This species seems to be closely related to the sandyback stingaree (U. bucculentus) and the patchwork stingaree (U. flavomosaicus).

== Distribution and habitat ==
The bottom-dwelling butterfly stingaree has only been recorded from a depth of 330 m (1,080 ft) on the continental slope off the Chesterfield Islands, northwest of New Caledonia.

== Description ==
The butterfly stingaree has a diamond-shaped pectoral fin disc 113–121% as wide as long, with broadly rounded outer corners. The snout forms an obtuse angle and has a protruding tip. The eyes are modest in size and immediately followed by teardrop-shaped spiracles. Between the nostrils is a large, skirt-shaped curtain of skin with a subtly fringed trailing margin. The mouth is moderately large and contains 10–13 papillae (nipple-shaped structures) in an row across the floor. There are 24–28 upper and 26–31 lower tooth rows. The five pairs of gill slits are short. The pelvic fins are small and rounded; males have slightly pointed claspers.

The tail is flattened at the base and tapers rapidly, measuring 63–70% as long as the disc. There is a serrated stinging spine placed atop the tail about midway along its length, which is preceded by a low dorsal fin. The tail may also have slight ridge of skin running along each side, and terminates in a very short, deep, leaf-shaped caudal fin. The skin entirely lacks dermal denticles. This species is yellowish to brownish above; the underside is white to cream, with a wide darker band along the lateral and posterior disc margins. The dorsal and caudal fins are dusky-edged, which is more obvious in juveniles. The butterfly stingaree grows to at least 40 cm (16 in) long.

== Biology and ecology ==
Little is known of the natural history of the butterfly stingaree. It is presumably aplacental viviparous with a small litter size, like other stingarees. The young are born at about 14 cm (5.5 in) long, and have large, faint lighter and darker blotches on the upper surface of the disc; the dark marginal bands beneath the disc are also absent. The males mature sexually at about 31 cm (12 in) long.

== Human interactions ==
The butterfly stingaree has been listed under Least Concern by the International Union for Conservation of Nature (IUCN), given that commercial trawl fisheries are absent from its range.
