= Yellowback stingaree =

Conservation status
- Vulnerable (IUCN 3.1)

Scientific classification
- Kingdom: Animalia
- Phylum: Chordata
- Class: Chondrichthyes
- Subclass: Elasmobranchii
- Order: Myliobatiformes
- Family: Urolophidae
- Genus: Urolophus
- Species: U. sufflavus

Binomial name
- Urolophus sufflavus Whitley, 1929

Species of cartilaginous fish

The yellowback stingaree (Urolophus sufflavus) is a locally abundant but little-known species of stingray in the family Urolophidae. It is almost endemic to New South Wales, with a range from Green Cape northward, extending only barely into Queensland (Stradbroke Island). It inhabits soft-substrate habitats and has been reported from depths of 45–300 metres (150–980 ft), though it is most common on the outer continental shelf at depths of 100–160 metres (330–520 ft).

This species attains a maximum length of 42 cm (17 in). It has a flattened pectoral fin disk about as wide as long, with rounded corners and straight anterior margins. There is a skirt-like nasal curtain in front of the mouth, without lateral lobes. The tail is short and stout, measuring 64-76% the length of the disk and bearing a serrated spine. The tail ends in a small caudal fin; there are no dorsal fins or lateral folds. The skin is devoid of dermal denticles. The colouration is uniformly yellowish above, sometimes with an ill-defined brown stripe running down the back.

The yellowback stingaree is likely ovoviviparous with low fecundity, as in other stingarees. Males mature at a length of 23 cm (9 in). This species shares the southern extent of its range with the banded stingaree (U. cruciatus). The two species apparently hybridize, highly unusual for cartilaginous fish, and produce offspring that are intermediate in colour pattern. In a 2007 study of 388 fishes, these two species were the only two that could not be distinguished on the basis of their cytochrome c gene sequences, attesting to a close evolutionary relationship.

Almost the entire range of the yellowback stingaree is under pressure from Australian Commonwealth and State-managed commercial fisheries. This species is caught as bycatch in otter trawls and gillnets; though it is generally discarded, survival post-capture is believed to be low, and in addition stingarees tend to abort gestating young if captured and handled. From 1966–67 to 1996–97, the capture rate of stingarees in trawl surveys on the New South Wales upper slope, including the yellowback stingaree, declined by some 65%. Trawl surveys off Sydney found a similar decline of 45%. These negative trends and this species' restricted distribution has led it to be assessed as Vulnerable by the World Conservation Union.
