= Java stingaree =

Conservation status
- Extinct (2019) (IUCN 3.1)

Scientific classification
- Kingdom: Animalia
- Phylum: Chordata
- Class: Chondrichthyes
- Subclass: Elasmobranchii
- Order: Myliobatiformes
- Family: Urolophidae
- Genus: Urolophus
- Species: †U. javanicus

Binomial name
- †Urolophus javanicus (Martens, 1864)

Synonyms
- Trygonoptera javanica Martens, 1864

Species of cartilaginous fish

The Java stingaree (Urolophus javanicus) is an extinct species of stingray in the family Urolophidae, known only from a single female specimen 33 cm (13 in) long caught off Jakarta, Indonesia. This species is characterized by an oval-shaped pectoral fin disc longer than wide, and a tail with a dorsal fin in front of the stinging spine and a caudal fin. It is brown above, with darker and lighter spots below, as well as a white speckled pattern along an extension of the dorsal. The International Union for Conservation of Nature has listed the Java stingaree as Extinct; as it has not been recorded since its discovery over 150 years ago, and its range is subject to heavy fishing pressure and habitat degradation.

== Taxonomy ==
In July 1862, German zoologist Eduard von Martens purchased the sole known specimen of the Java stingaree at a fish market in Jakarta. He described it as Trygonoptera javanica in an 1864 volume of the scientific journal Monatsberichte der Akademie der Wissenschaft zu Berlin (Monthly Report of the Academy of Sciences, Berlin). Subsequent authors moved this species to the genus Urolophus.

== Distribution and habitat ==
The Java stingaree has only been found in the Java Sea, perhaps in the vicinity of Jakarta. Its exact range, and depth and habitat preferences, are unknown but probably very restricted.

== Description ==
The Java stingaree has an oval pectoral fin disc slightly longer than wide; the leading margins are gently convex and converge at a blunt angle on the snout. The eyes are followed by larger, comma-shaped spiracles. The nostrils are crescent-like, and between them is a curtain of skin with a minutely fringed posterior margin. The mouth is bow-shaped, and contains three papillae (nipple-like structures) on the floor. The teeth are closely arranged with a quincunx pattern; each is small with a transverse ridge on the crown. The five pairs of gill slits are short. The pelvic fins are almost square, with rounded corners. The tail is shorter than the disc and bears a prominent dorsal fin about halfway along its length; immediately posterior to the dorsal fin is a serrated stinging spine. The tail ends in a leaf-shaped caudal fin, whose dorsal origin lies behind the ventral origin. The skin is devoid of dermal denticles, though there are tiny white bumps on the upper central portion of the disc. This species is dark brown above, with many indistinct darker and lighter spots, and pale below. The sole specimen measures 33 cm (13 in) long.

== Biology and ecology ==
Very little is known of the natural history of the Java stingaree. It is presumably aplacental viviparous with a small litter size, as in other stingarees.

== Human interactions ==
No new Java stingaree specimens have emerged since the first was discovered over 150 years ago, and it has now been classified as extinct. There is heavy fishing activity within its range, as well as habitat degradation from the proximity of major population centers. While it is possible that captured specimens have gone unrecognized, if this species still survived its population would almost certainly be gravely imperilled; this has led to the International Union for Conservation of Nature (IUCN) assessing it as Extinct as of 22 March 2019.
