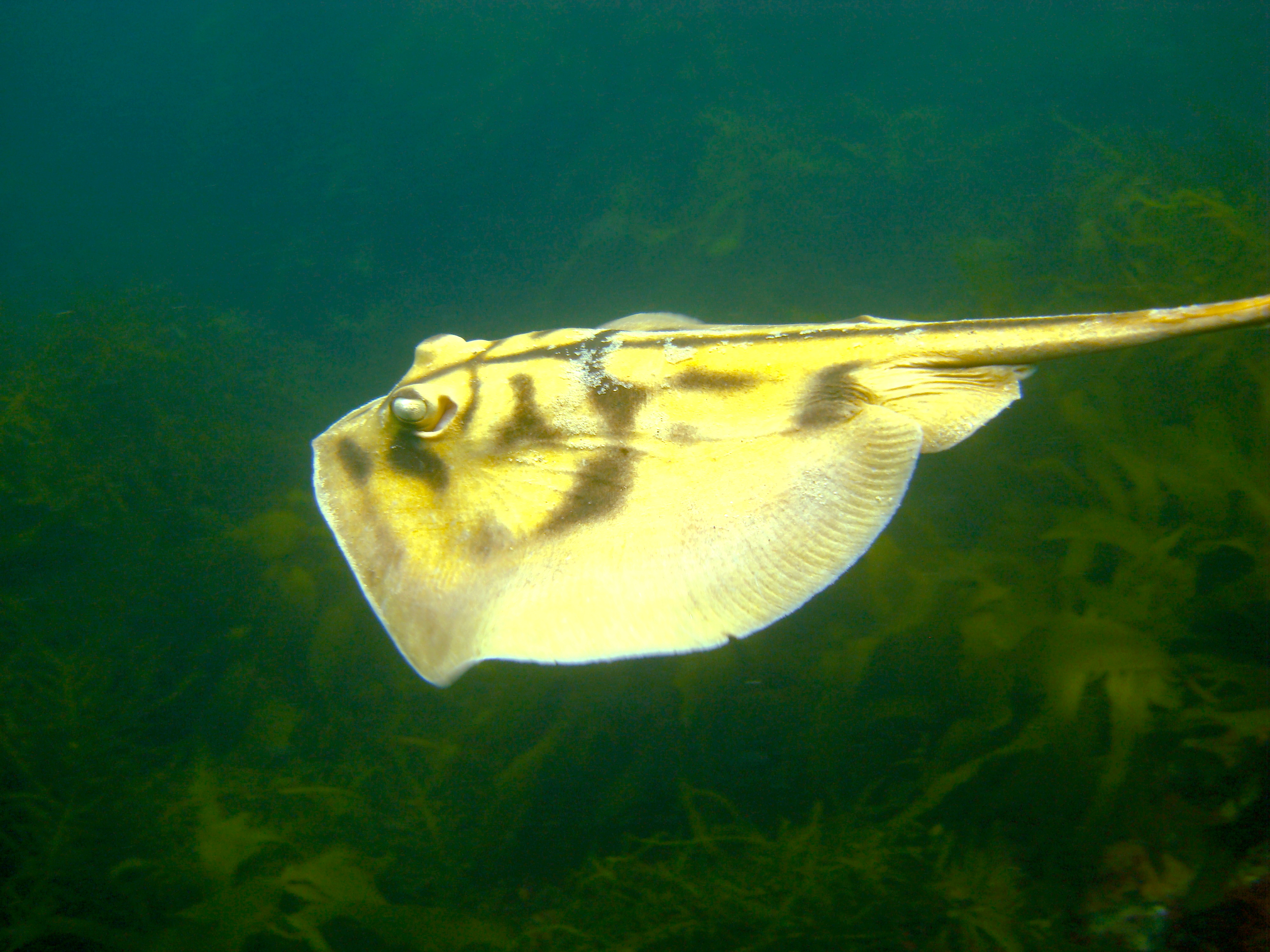
- Urolophus cruciatus

Scientific classification
- Kingdom: Animalia
- Phylum: Chordata
- Class: Chondrichthyes
- Subclass: Elasmobranchii
- Order: Myliobatiformes
- Family: Urolophidae
- Genus: Urolophus; J. P. Müller & Henle, 1837

Type species
- Raja cruciata Lacépède, 1804

= Urolophus =

Genus of cartilaginous fishes

Urolophus is a genus of round rays mostly native to the western Pacific Ocean and the Indian Ocean, though one species occurs in the Pacific waters of the Mexican coast. Müller and Henle erected Urolophus in an 1837 issue of Bericht Akademie der Wissenschaften zu Berlin. The name is derived from the Greek oura, meaning "tail", and lophos, meaning "crest". In Urolophus, the outer rims of the nostrils are not enlarged into lobes, but may form a small knob at the back.

A fossil species, Urolophus crassicaudatus, has been found in Monte Bolca, northern Italy, in deposits dating back to the late Ypresian stage of the Eocene epoch (49 Ma); however, Marramà et al. (2020) transferred this species to the genus Arechia.

== Species ==
There are currently 21 recognized species in this genus:

- Urolophus aurantiacus J. P. Müller & Henle, 1841 (Sepia stingray)
- †Urolophus bicuneatus Noetling, 1885
- Urolophus bucculentus W. J. Macleay, 1884 (Sandyback stingaree)
- Urolophus circularis R. J. McKay, 1966 (Circular stingaree)
- Urolophus cruciatus Lacépède, 1804 (Crossback stingaree)
- Urolophus deforgesi Séret & Last, 2003 (Chesterfield Island stingaree)
- Urolophus expansus McCulloch, 1916 (Wide stingaree)
- Urolophus flavomosaicus Last & M. F. Gomon, 1987 (Patchwork stingaree)
- Urolophus gigas T. D. Scott, 1954 (Spotted stingaree)
- †Urolophus javanicus E. von Martens, 1864 (Java stingaree)
- Urolophus kaianus Günther, 1880 (Kai stingaree)
- Urolophus kapalensis Yearsley & Last, 2006 (Kapala stingaree)
- Urolophus lobatus R. J. McKay, 1966 (Lobed stingaree)
- Urolophus mitosis Last & M. F. Gomon, 1987 (Mitotic stingaree)
- Urolophus neocaledoniensis Séret & Last, 2003 (New Caledonian stingaree)
- Urolophus orarius Last & M. F. Gomon, 1987 (Coastal stingaree)
- Urolophus papilio Séret & Last, 2003 (Butterfly stingaree)
- Urolophus paucimaculatus J. M. Dixon, 1969 (Sparsely-spotted stingaree)
- Urolophus piperatus Séret & Last, 2003 (Coral Sea stingaree)
- Urolophus sufflavus Whitley, 1929 (Yellowback stingaree)
- Urolophus viridis McCulloch, 1916 (Greenback stingaree)
- Urolophus westraliensis Last & M. F. Gomon, 1987 (Brown stingaree)

== See also ==
- List of prehistoric cartilaginous fish
