= CSIRO Division of Fisheries =

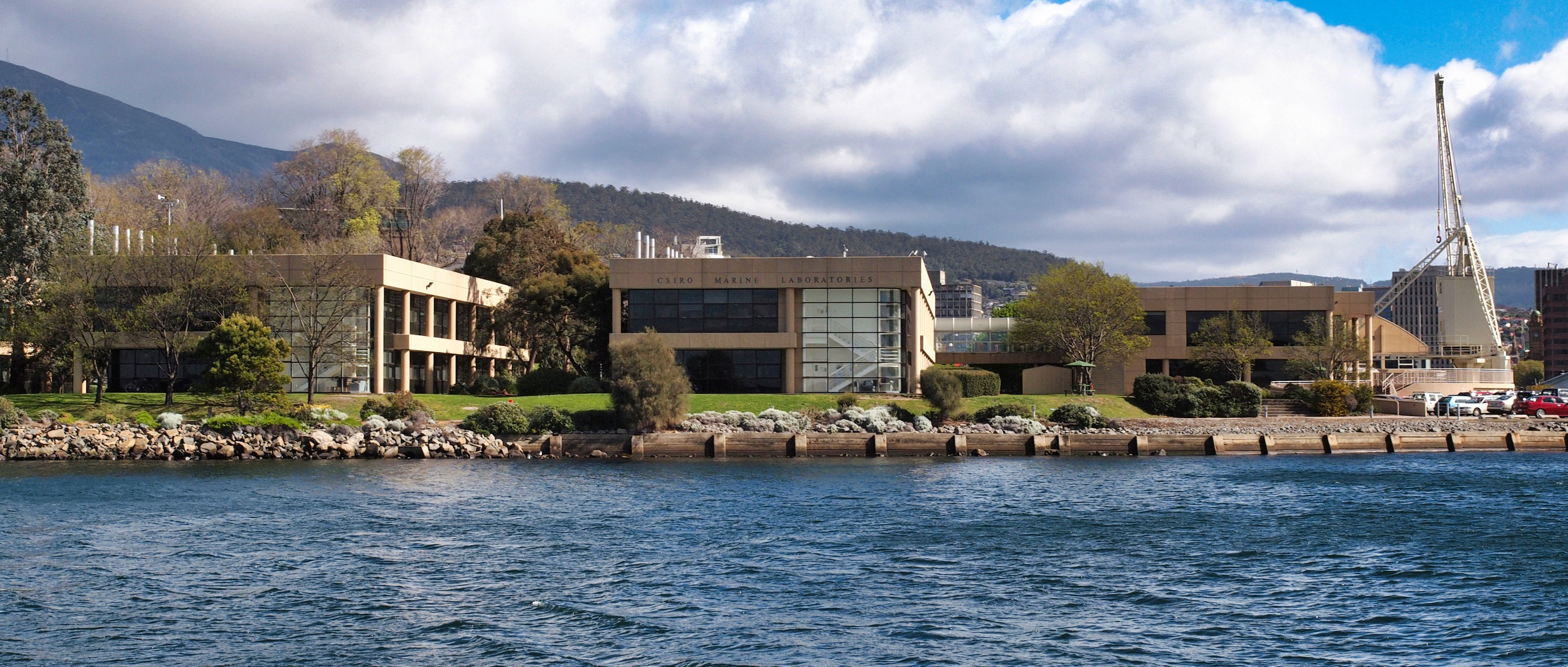
- Formation: 1940
- Dissolved: 1997
- Type: Research division
- Headquarters: Cronulla, New South Wales then Hobart, Tasmania
- Coordinates: 42°53′14″S 147°20′19″E
- Fields: Fisheries Research, Oceanographic Research.
- Parent organization: CSIRO | Commonwealth Scientific and Industrial Research Organisation
- Website: https://research.csiro.au

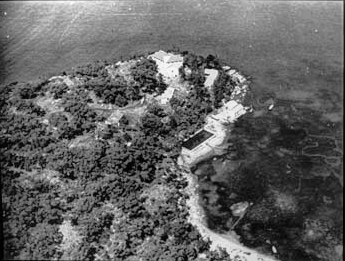
Hungry Point, Cronulla in 1923, home of the Division of Fisheries, 1940–1994.

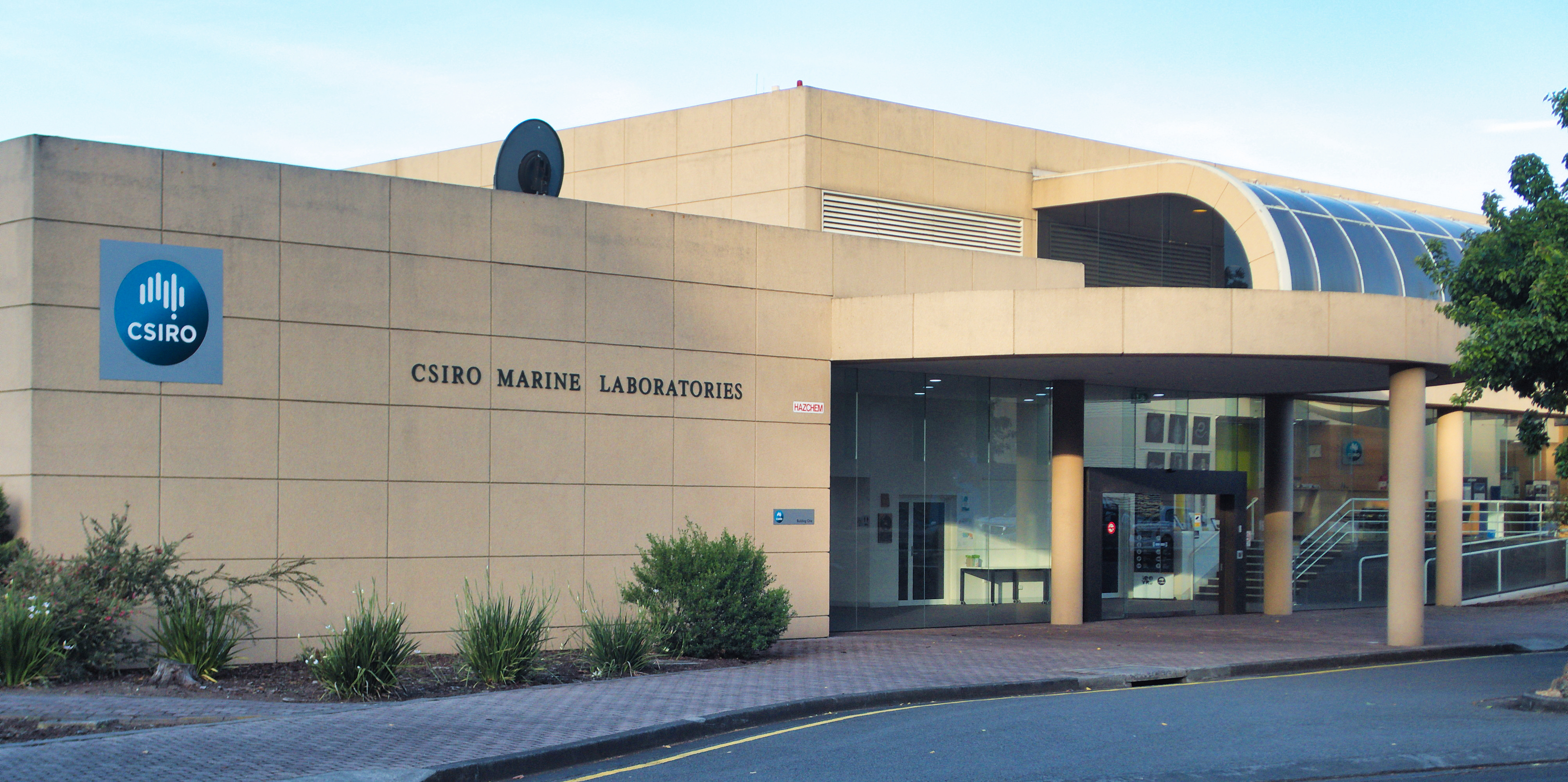
CSIRO Marine Laboratories, Hobart, home of the Division of Fisheries, 1984–1997.

The CSIRO Division of Fisheries (1940–1997), also officially named the "CSIRO Division of Fisheries and Oceanography" and "CSIRO Division of Fisheries Research" at different times, was a research section (Division) of the CSIRO (Commonwealth Scientific Industrial and Research organisation), Australia's national science research agency, operating up to 1997, specialising in fisheries research plus some elements of oceanography. It was formally preceded by the CSIRO (then C.S.I.R.) Fisheries Investigations Section (1936–1940). Its principal initial purpose was to explore what fish stocks existed in waters around the Australian continent, and how they could most effectively be exploited for human consumption; later emphasis shifted to whole-of-ecosystem investigation and analysis, from phytoplankton and benthic and pelagic communities to top predators, as well as the oceanographic and physical factors controlling these elements, plus providing advice to fisheries and environmental managers regarding appropriate management and conservation regimes that would be in accord with sustainable use of the stocks concerned. The Division ceased to exist as a named entity (although its work was carried on) in 1997 when it was merged with the CSIRO Division of Oceanography under the name CSIRO Marine Research.

== Description and formation ==
The CSIRO (then C.S.I.R.) Division of Fisheries was established in 1940, as a successor the previous Fisheries Investigation Section (1936–1940). In recognition of its developing component of non-biological oceanographic work, it was renamed the Division of Fisheries and Oceanography in 1956. The oceanographic component was split off as a separate Division of Oceanography in 1981, with the balance of staff and activity carried over as the Division of Fisheries Research, which reverted once more to the name Division of Fisheries in 1988. In 1997 it re-merged with the Division of Oceanography to form CSIRO Marine Research.

== Location ==
Until c.1984 its headquarters and the majority of its staff were based in Cronulla, New South Wales; from that date the staff were transferred to new, purpose-built accommodation at the CSIRO Marine Laboratories in Hobart, Tasmania. Smaller complements of Division of Fisheries staff were also employed at regional laboratories in Marmion, a suburb of Perth in Western Australia, and Cleveland, a suburb of Brisbane in Queensland., also historically at some other locations around Australia (refer "History").

== Staffing and budget ==
According to figures quoted in Mawson et al., in 1938 the nascent Division already employed 10 scientists plus 12 support staff; by 1970/71, as "Fisheries and Oceanography" the figures were 26 research scientists, 27 "other professional" staff and 76 support staff; and in 1987 (with removal of relevant staff to the new Oceanography Division) 97 research and technical staff and 28 support staff. In 1981-1982 its operating budget (from government sources) was AUD$7.3 million.

== History and activities ==
To 1988, this section represents, in the main, a condensed version of the "chronology" chapter in Mawson et al., pp. 210-216, to which reference should be made for full information.

=== Pre-1940s ===
- 1926: Establishment of a Fisheries Section included in H.F. Heath, "Recommendations for the Reconstitution of the Commonwealth Institute of Science and Industry", the latter established as C.S.I.R. (precursor to CSIRO) the same year
- 1933: Government allocates funds for fisheries investigations in four areas: procure survey vessel; experiments in fish canning; curing and preserving; marketing
- 1935: Commonwealth fisheries investigations transferred to C.S.I.R.; secondment to C.S.I.R. of Stanley Fowler
- 1936: Stanley Fowler commences C.S.I.R. aerial surveys looking for pelagic fish off New South Wales, Victoria and Tasmania
- 1937: Harold Thompson takes up duties as officer-in-charge of C.S.I.R. "Fisheries Investigation Section", initially based in Melbourne, first other staff appointed (E.J. Ferguson Wood)
- 1938: Fisheries Investigation Section transfers to former fish hatchery site in Cronulla (occupied 1939); new research vessel Warrreen delivered and makes first cruise
- 1939: David Rochford (hydrologist) appointed, hydrology work commences

=== 1940s ===
- 1940: Fisheries Investigation Section renamed Division of Fisheries, H. Thompson as inaugural chief
- 1941: Alan Tubb transferred to Tasmania to commence Fisheries work there
- 1942: Warrreen requisitioned for war work, first aerial surveys in Western Australia
- 1943: Dom Serventy transferred to Western Australia to establish a presence there for the Division
- 1945: Liawenee begins hydrological work off Tasmania
- 1946: "Stowell" (large house in Battery Point, Hobart) purchased by CSIRO for Tasmanian laboratories; Warrreen returned to C.S.I.R. (work re-commenced 1947)
- 1948: Thursday Island station established for pearl shell work; retirement of Stanley Fowler; commissioning of new vessel in his name (FRV Stenley Fowler); FRV Fairwind used for work in Papua New Guinea
- 1949: Dunwich research station established on North Stradbroke Island, Queensland; C.S.I.R. becomes CSIRO

=== 1950s ===
- 1950: FRV Fairwind lost at sea with all hands; CSIRO purchases FRV Derwent Hunter
- 1951: Division commences whaling studies; FRV Gahleru commissioned for Torres Strait pearl oyster program; Warrreen transferred to RAN (Royal Australian Navy)
- 1954: Lake Macquarie study (to 1956); retirement of Harold Thompson (Maurice Blackburn becomes acting chief)
- 1955: Hamon/Brown-developed CTD trialled on Derwent Hunter
- 1956: Appointment of G.F. Humphrey as chief, Division renamed "Fisheries and Oceanography"; Derwent Hunter commences blue-water (oceonographic) research
- 1957: Hamon salinometer developed
- 1958: Division hosts conference on oceanography of Coral and Tasman Seas
- 1959: Derwent Hunter returns to fisheries research; HMAS Diamantina loaned to CSIRO for Indian Ocean work

=== 1960s ===
- 1960: HMAS Gascoyne loaned to CSIRO for work in Tasman Sea; Division participates in International Indian Ocean Expedition (IIOE) (to 1965)
- 1962: Camberwell Laboratory established in Melbourne; Derwent Hunter sold
- 1963: Tasmanian laboratory closed; studies of larval western rock lobster commence in Western Australia; Gulf of Carpentaria prawn survey commences (to 1965)
- 1966: East Coast Prawn Project begins
- 1969: Camberwell laboratory closed; Northern Prawn Project begins

=== 1970s ===
- 1971: G.F. Humphrey retires as chief, establishes Marine Biochemistry Unit; D.J. Rochford becomes acting chief
- 1972: Queensland Department of Primary Industries Deception Bay laboratory completed, used by CSIRO as a base for prawn studies; K. Radway Allen appointed as chief; first use of satellite-tracked buoys for studying ocean currents
- 1973: Estuarine group established; Marmion, WA laboratory opens with R.G. Chittleborough as officer-in-charge; RV Kalinda commissioned for use by the East Coast Prawn Project; R.V. Sprightly chartered for use off Western Australia
- 1974: Estuarine Ecology commences, with survey of Port Hacking
- 1975: Cleveland, QLD laboratory planned, with W. Dall as officer-in-charge; FRV Courageous chartered for fisheries research; Karumba, QLD laboratory planned with D. Staples as officer-in-charge (new site purchased in 1976)
- 1976: Cleveland and Marmion laboratories both completed
- 1977: Western Australian Coastal Ecology project commences; Marine Biochemistry Unit re-absorbed into Division
- 1979: FRV Soela chartered for fisheries research; FRV Courageous charter ends

=== 1980s ===
- 1981: Oceanographic work split off from Fisheries work as new Division of Oceanogrphy (founding chief: Angus McEwan), still based in Cronulla; parliamentary approval given for construction of new marine Laboratories in Hobart to house both Divisions
- 1982: RV Sprightly undertakes "Aurorex" circumnavigation cruise; North-West Shelf Project begins
- 1984: Staff begin transfer to Hobart; Southern Temperate Resources Program begins; last charter cruise of RV Sprightly
- 1985: Cronulla Laboratories formally cease operation; official opening of new CSIRO Marine Laboratories in Hobart
- 1988: Name of Division changed from "Fisheries Research" to "Fisheries"

For additional activities over this period, refer "Research Report. Division of Fisheries. 1985-1987" and "CSIRO Division of Fisheries: Research Report 1987/90" (no electronic access presently found).

=== 1990-1997 ===
For activities over this period, refer "Research Report. CSIRO Division of Fisheries, 1990-1991" and successors (as available), also relevant CSIRO (whole of Organisation) annual reports. From the latter, under Division of Fisheries Research Programs, the following are listed:

- 1990-91: Population dynamics and fish stock assessment; Phytoplankton resources; South and southeast fisheries resources; North and northeast fisheries resources; West and northwest fisheries resources; Biological oceanography; Environmental management and protection
- 1991-92 through to 1995-96: Tropical Fisheries Resources; Pelagic Fisheries Resources; Mariculture; Temperate and Deepwater Fisheries Resources; Marine Environment Research
- 1997: Division (re-) merges with Division of Oceanography to form new "Division of Marine Research".

A summary of the Division's activities as at 1989 is included in an account by N. Elliot and A. Woods published in the journal "Maritime Studies". For an extensive earlier account during the Cronulla years, refer Austin, 1973. The comprehensive volume by Mawson et al., 1988, cited above, contains much other historical information including chapters by key figures involved in Divisional research through the years, among them K. Radway Allen, Maurice Blackburn, Graham Chittleborough, George Cresswell, Bill Dall, Bruce Hamon, George Humphrey, Shirley Jeffrey, Harry Jitts, Geoffrey Kesteven, Ian Munro, Alan Pearce, Bruce Phillips, David Rochford and David Tranter.

== Divisional chiefs/other leaders ==
Source: CSIROpedia

- 1940–54 Harold Thompson (previously Officer-in-Charge, Fisheries Investigations Section, 1936–40)
- 1956–71 George Frederick Humphrey ("Fisheries & Oceanography")
- 1972–77 Kenneth Radway Allen ("Fisheries & Oceanography")
- 1977–80 David James Rochford ("Fisheries & Oceanography")
- 1981 Brian Devenish Stacey ("Fisheries Research", acting)
- 1981–84 Shirley Winifred Jeffrey ("Fisheries Research", acting)
- 1984–90 Frederick Robert "Roy" Harden Jones ("Fisheries Research" to 1988, then "Fisheries" again)
- 1990–97 Peter Colin Young

From 1997 the Division ceased to exist in a formal sense, being replaced by "Marine Research" (founding chief: Christoph Bruno Fandry 1996–97).

== Geographic area(s) of activity ==
In general terms, the Division's activities corresponded to research relevant to selected Commonwealth fisheries in the Australian Fishing Zone largely as indicated in this map, in addition to conducting exploratory surveys in some adjacent waters plus (during the period when oceanographic research was also included) some wider scale, open ocean activities of an oceanographic nature (including participating in the 1959–1965 International Indian Ocean Expedition). The Division's biological records resulting from research in multiple geographic areas were utilised as a key contribution to the Integrated Marine and Coastal Regionalisation of Australia, which aims to understand and document the entire marine ecosystem(s) under Australian jurisdiction from an ecological perspective, without restriction just to areas with fishable stocks. Fish stocks in coastal waters (to 3 nautical miles from shore) were generally not investigated by the Division, instead being the province of the relevant Australian State or Territory, who typically have their own fisheries agency that conducts research in those waters (refer fish.gov.au), while the Great Barrier Reef and certain other associated tropical marine environments were excluded, being the area of interest of the Australian Institute of Marine Science. For logistic as well as jurisdictional reasons, the southernmost portions of the Australian Fishing Zone (the subantarctic waters around Macquarie Island and Heard Island and McDonald Islands) were generally not included within the purview of the Division, instead being included in the area of operation of the Australian Antarctic Division.

== Research outputs ==
Research outputs from the Division's activities took the form of internal and external reports, publications in the scientific literature, carrying out commissioned research for the Australian Fisheries Management Authority (AFMA) and the Fisheries Research and Development Corporation (FRDC), and providing advice and in some areas, contracted research for Government Departments (especially Environment) as needed. By 1988, it was reported that members of "the division" (also including staff who by then had become the separate Division of Oceanography) had published nearly 2,000 articles in scientific journals, plus monographs; a 2026 search on "Google Scholar" yields about 5,100 results (articles plus monographs) that include [CSIRO] "Division of Fisheries" in the text, the majority comprising works authored by staff of the Division as primary or associate author (an equivalent search for "Division of Oceanography" yields approx. 1,200 results, some of which may be included in the 1988 figure quoted).

== Vessels used by CSIRO Fisheries (and its alternates) over the years ==
Source: "CSIRO at Sea" (1988), with Southern Surveyor added

- MV Australia (1948)
- LFB Challenger (1960s)
- FRV Courageous (1975–1979)
- MV Cygnus
- MV Degei (1965–1966)
- FRV Derwent Hunter (1950–1962)
- HMAS Diamantina (1959–1970s)
- FV Estelle Star (1961–1962)
- MV Fairwind (1948–1950)
- ORV Franklin (1985–?)
- FRV Gahleru (1951–1960)
- HMAS Gascoyne (1960–1961)
- LFB Gondwana (1950s)
- MV H.C. Dannevig (1948)
- MV Islander VI (1970–1971)
- MV Isobel (1945–1948)
- FRV Jaybee (1950–1960)
- RV Kalinda (1973–1976)
- RV Kareela (1977–1983)
- RV Karin (1972–1984)
- HMAS Kimbla (1960s)
- FRV Liawenee (1945–1951)
- FRV Marelda (1946)
- FV Maxim (1980s)
- FV Nimbus (1968)
- MV Patanela (1974)
- FV Paxie (1960s)
- RV Penaeus (1972–?)
- MV Penghana (1960s)
- HMAS Queenborough (1958)
- HMAS Quickmatch (1958)
- FV Rachel (1984–1985)
- FV Rama (1963–1965)
- FV Saga (1960–1966)
- MV Sandpiper (1980s)
- MV Scottsman (1980s)
- FRV Soela (1979–1988)
- FV Southern Endeavour (1960–1961)
- FRV Southern Surveyor (1988–1995)
- RV Sprightly (1973–1983)
- Squilla (unknown dates)
- FRV Stanley Fowler (1948–1951)
- FV Suda Bay (1952–1953)
- HMAS Taipan (1946)
- FRV Thyrsites (1959–1960)
- MV Tipton (1940s)
- FRV Tom Thumb (1967–1969)
- FV Two Freddies plus other boats (1961–1962)
- MV Villaret (1950)
- FRV Warreen (1938–1951)
- HMAS Warrego (1959–1960)
- Wattamolla (unknown dates)
- FRV Weerutta (1961).

== See also ==
- CSIRO
- CSIRO Marine Research
- CSIRO Oceans and Atmosphere
- RV Soela
- RV Southern Surveyor
