= Circular stingaree =

Conservation status
- Least Concern (IUCN 3.1)

Scientific classification
- Kingdom: Animalia
- Phylum: Chordata
- Class: Chondrichthyes
- Subclass: Elasmobranchii
- Order: Myliobatiformes
- Family: Urolophidae
- Genus: Urolophus
- Species: U. circularis

Binomial name
- Urolophus circularis McKay, 1966

Species of cartilaginous fish

The circular stingaree (Urolophus circularis) is an uncommon, little-known species of stingray in the family Urolophidae. Endemic to the coastal waters of southwestern Australia, it prefers a rocky and/or vegetated habitat. Reaching 60 cm (24 in) in length, this species is characterized by an oval pectoral fin disc bearing a striking dorsal pattern of lighter spots and rings, and a central circle of white-margined black spots, on a bluish gray background. Between its nostrils is a skirt-shaped curtain of skin, with the posterior corners drawn out into lobes. Its tail bears a rather large dorsal fin in front of the stinging spine, and ends in a deep, lance-like caudal fin. Negligibly affected by human activity, the circular stingaree has been listed under Least Concern by the International Union for Conservation of Nature (IUCN).

== Taxonomy ==
The first known specimen of the circular stingaree was collected off Carnac Island, near Fremantle, Western Australia. Australian ichthyologist Roland McKay described it in a 1966 issue of the Journal of the Royal Society of Western Australia, giving it the specific epithet circularis in reference to its shape. Another common name for this species is banded stingray.

== Distribution and habitat ==
Rather uncommon, the circular stingaree has a restricted range off southwestern Australia between Esperance and Rottnest Island. It is a benthic species that can be found from the shore to a depth of 120 m (390 ft), generally sighted over rocks and reefs, or amongst kelp.

== Description ==
The pectoral fin disc of the circular stingaree is oval in shape and about as wide as long. The anterior margins of the disc are gently convex and converge at a broad angle on the fleshy snout, the tip of which is slightly protruding. The eyes are large, and followed by comma-shaped spiracles with rounded posterior margins. Between the smooth-rimmed nostrils, there is a short, skirt-shaped curtain of skin with the posterior corners extended into lobes. The sizable mouth contains 10 papillae (nipple-shaped structures) on the floor, and small teeth with roughly oval bases. The five pairs of gill slits are short. The pelvic fins are small and rounded.

The tail is oval in cross-section and measures about two-thirds as long as the disc, ending in a short, deep, leaf-shaped caudal fin. A relatively large dorsal fin is positioned on the upper surface of the tail, followed shortly by the serrated stinging spine. The tail lacks lateral skin folds. The skin is entirely smooth. This species is slate-blue above with numerous whitish spots, blotches, and rings, and distinctive large black spots with white borders arranged in a ring at the center of the disc. The dorsal fin and margin of the caudal fin may be brownish. The underside is plain white, becoming light brown on the tail. The largest known specimen is 60 cm (24 in) long.

== Biology and ecology ==
Little information is available on the natural history of the circular stingaree. It is aplacental viviparous, with the developing embryos sustained by maternally produced histotroph ("uterine milk"). Judging from related species, litter sizes are probably small. Males attain sexual maturity at below 53 cm (21 in) long.

== Human interactions ==
Only a handful of circular stingaree specimens have been deposited in museum collections. This species faces no substantial threats from human activity; a few are caught incidentally by the small number of scallop and prawn trawlers operating in the region, but its preference for rough or vegetated terrain largely shields it from fishing. Therefore, the International Union for Conservation of Nature (IUCN) has listed it under Least Concern. This species would potentially benefit from the implementation of the 2004 Australian National Plan of Action for the Conservation and Management of Sharks.
