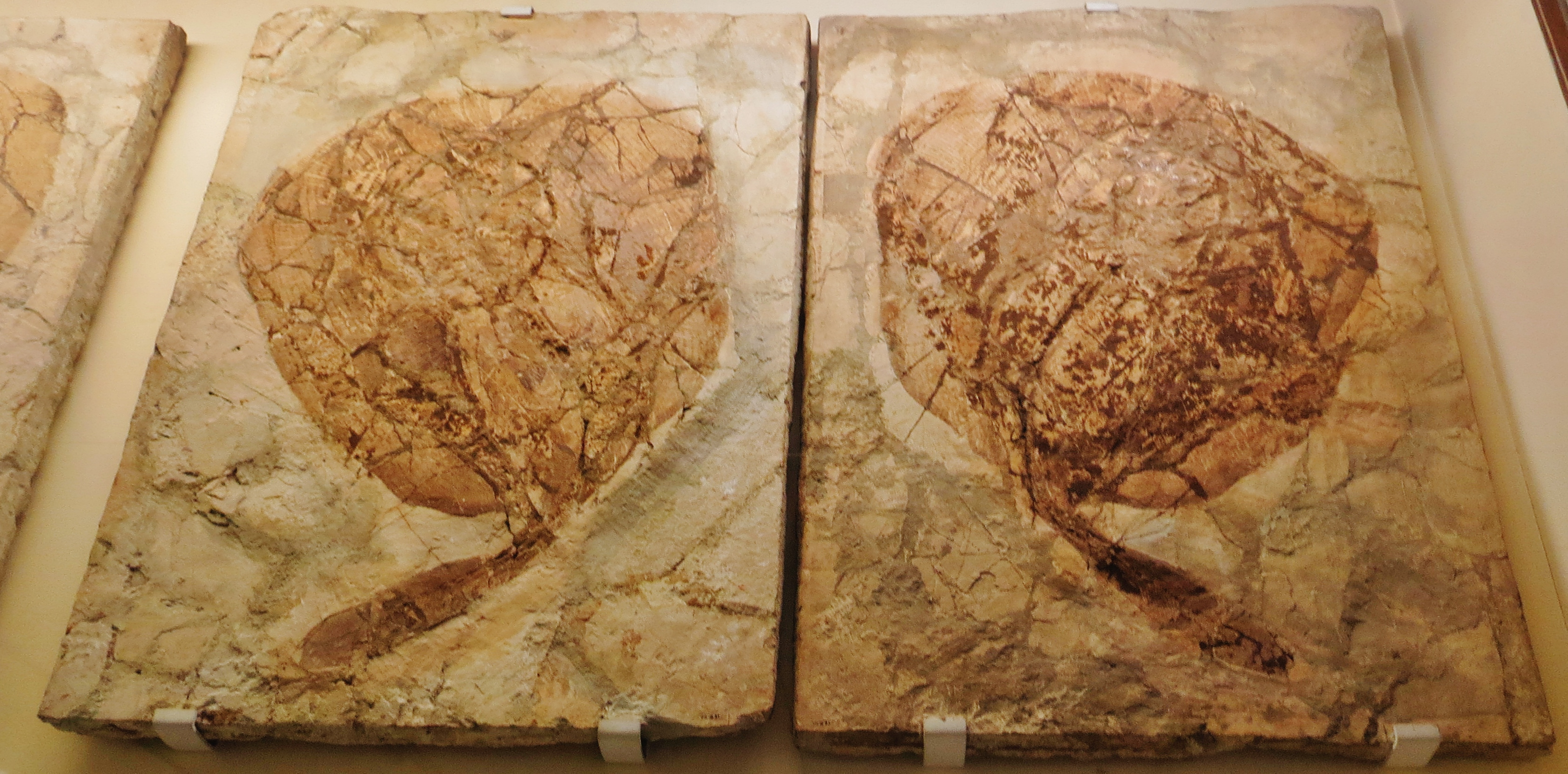
- A. crassicaudata specimen, Museo di Storia Naturale di Verona

Scientific classification
- Kingdom: Animalia
- Phylum: Chordata
- Class: Chondrichthyes
- Subclass: Elasmobranchii
- Order: Myliobatiformes
- Family: Urolophidae
- Genus: †Arechia; Cappetta, 1983

Type species
- Arechia arambourgi Cappetta, 1983

Other species
- A. crassicaudata (de Blainville, 1818)

= Arechia =

Arechia Temporal range: Ypresian–Bartonian Potential Rupelian occurrence

Extinct genus of stingrays

Arechia is an extinct genus of stingaree from the Paleogene epoch. It is known from two species (one known from articulated remains, the other from isolated teeth) that inhabited the northern Tethys Ocean during the Early Eocene. Isolated teeth of this genus are also known, potentially as late as the Early Oligocene.

== Taxonomy ==
It is the oldest known stingaree genus, though molecular data suggests they diverged from butterfly rays about 75 million years ago or from deepwater stingrays around the time of the K-Pg transition.

The type species, A. arambourgi Cappetta, 1983, is known from isolated teeth found in the Ypresian deposits of Ouled Abdoun, Morocco. It is named for Camille Arambourg, who originally ascribed these teeth to Raja praealba in 1952. Henri Cappetta revised the species in 1983, erecting this genus for those Arambourg called males in this genus and placed the ones he called females in Merabatis.

The second species, A. crassicaudata (de Blainville, 1818) is from the Ypresian-age Bolca Lagerstätte of Italy and is known from several articulated individuals. This species was placed in various genera, generally in Urolophus, until finally being attributed to Arechia in 2020, due to the close resemblance of its teeth to those of A. arambourgi. The inferred environment of the Monte Postale site where this species is found matches with the typical warm, shallow environment of extant representatives of this family. The bizarre Lessiniabatis was initially thought to represent a partial specimen of this species.

In addition to these two species, isolated teeth of Arechia sp. are known from several sites throughout North Africa, including from the Ypresian & Lutetian of Senegal, Bartonian of Tunisia, and potentially the Rupelian of Egypt.
