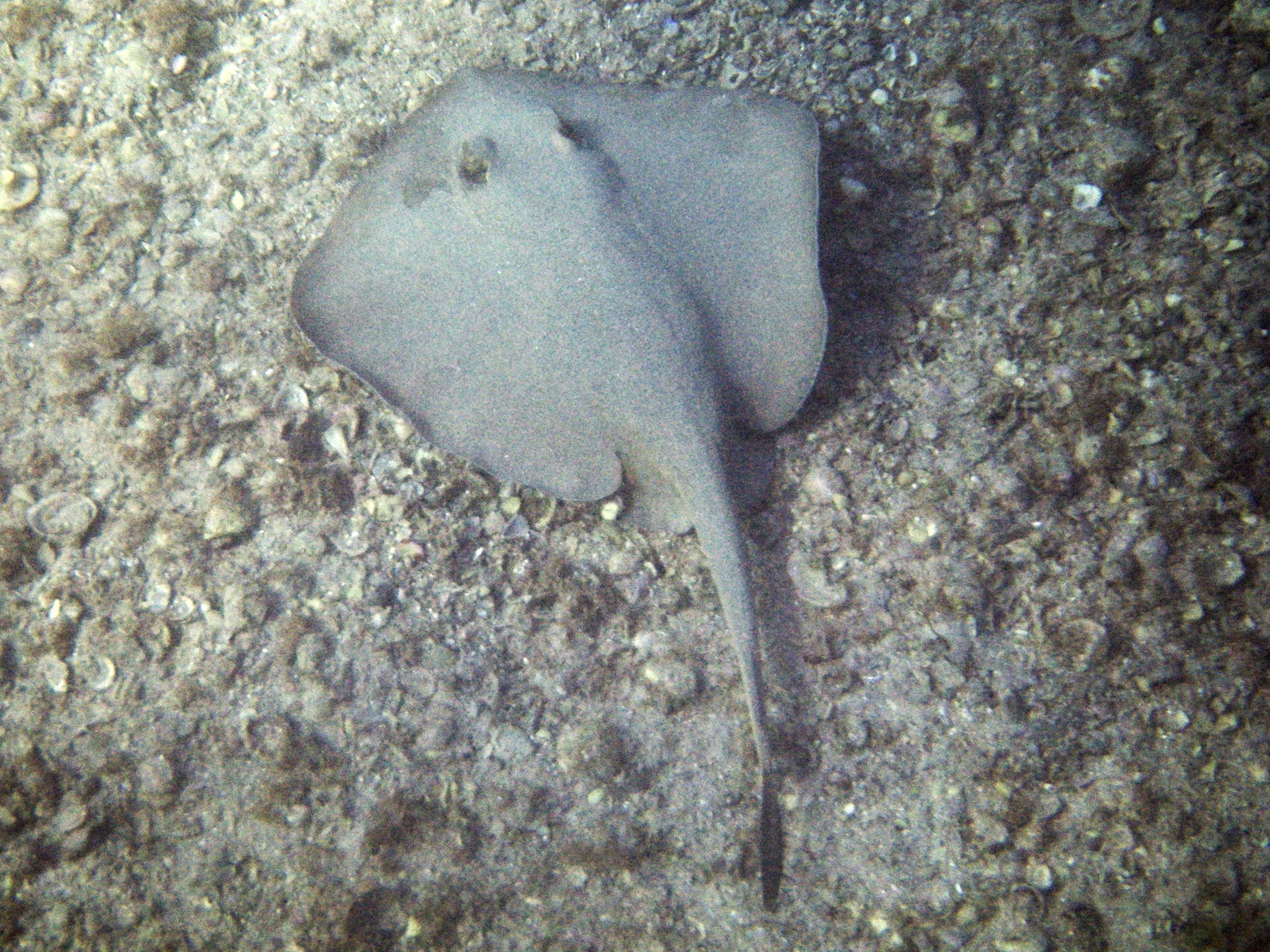

Conservation status
- Vulnerable (IUCN 3.1)

Scientific classification
- Kingdom: Animalia
- Phylum: Chordata
- Class: Chondrichthyes
- Subclass: Elasmobranchii
- Order: Myliobatiformes
- Family: Urolophidae
- Genus: Urolophus
- Species: U. viridis

Binomial name
- Urolophus viridis McCulloch, 1916

= Greenback stingaree =

Species of cartilaginous fish

The greenback stingaree (Urolophus viridis) is a little-known species of stingray in the family Urolophidae, endemic to the outer continental shelf and upper continental slope off southeastern Australia. Growing to a length of 51 cm (20 in), this species has a diamond-shaped pectoral fin disc wider than long and uniformly light green in color above. Between its nostrils is a skirt-shaped curtain of skin. Its tail bears skin folds on either side and a deep, lanceolate caudal fin, but lacks a dorsal fin.

Usually found over soft substrates at a depth of 80–180 m (260–590 ft), the greenback stingaree is a predator of polychaete worms and crustaceans. It is aplacental viviparous, with developing embryos are sustained by maternally produced histotroph ("uterine milk"). Females bear litters of 1–3 pups annually after a 10–12 month gestation period. Substantial numbers of greenback stingarees are caught incidentally in trawls; captured rays rarely survive and also tend to abort their young. Stingaree populations on the New South Wales upper slope, presumably including this species, have declined precipitously as a result of commercial fishing. Consequently, the International Union for Conservation of Nature (IUCN) has listed the greenback stingaree as Vulnerable.

== Taxonomy ==
The greenback stingaree was described by Australian ichthyologist Allan Riverstone McCulloch in a 1916 volume of the scientific journal Biological Results Endeavour, who gave it the specific epithet viridis from the Latin word for "green". The type specimen was collected from a depth of 90 m (300 ft) off Green Cape in New South Wales, by the research vessel FIS Endeavour. An undescribed stingaree possibly belonging to this species has also been found in deep water off southwestern Australia; it is very similar to the greenback stingaree but has more pectoral fin rays (106–107 versus under 100).

== Distribution and habitat ==
Once common, the greenback stingaree occurs in warm-temperate waters from Portland in Victoria to Stradbroke Island off Queensland, including all of Tasmania. Deeper-living than most other stingarees in the region, this benthic species is mainly found over fine sediment at a depth of 80–180 m (260–590 ft) on the outer continental shelf and upper continental slope. However, it has been reported from as shallow as 20 m (66 ft) and as deep as 300 m (980 ft).

== Description ==
The greenback stingaree has a diamond-shaped pectoral fin disc wider than long, with broadly rounded outer corners. The leading margins of the disc are nearly straight, and converge at an obtuse angle on the fleshy snout. The tip of the snout protrudes slightly past the disc. The eyes are large and followed by comma-shaped spiracles with rounded posterior margins. There is a skirt-shaped curtain of skin between the nostrils, with a finely fringed posterior margin; the posterior corners of the nasal curtain are extended into small lobes. The medium-sized mouth contains 4–7 variably shaped papillae (nipple-like structures) on the floor; additional papillae are found in a narrow strip on the lower jaw. The teeth are small with roughly oval bases, and the five pairs of gill slits are short. The pelvic fins are small and rounded on their trailing margins.

The tail is flattened at the base and measures 75–91% as long as the disc; a prominent skin fold runs along each side, and a deep, lance-shaped caudal fin is found at the end. The upper surface of the tail bears a serrated stinging spine about halfway along its length; there is no dorsal fin. The skin entirely lacks dermal denticles. This species is a plain light green above, becoming lighter towards the edge of the disc, and off-white below, becoming purplish or pinkish towards the lateral margins of the disc; the ventral, lateral disc margins may also have a dark brown edge or blotches. The caudal fin is colored dark brown in juveniles and olive in adults. Some individuals are dark beneath the tail and/or on the tip of the snout. The maximum recorded length is 51 cm (20 in).

== Biology and ecology ==
The greenback stingaree preys mainly on polychaete worms and crustaceans. It is known to be parasitized by a species of monogenean (parasitic flatworm) in the genus Calicotyle. Like other stingrays, it is aplacental viviparous with the developing embryos sustained via histotroph ("uterine milk") produced by the mother. Females produce 1–3 pups per year, following a gestation period lasting 10–12 months. Males and females attain sexual maturity at approximately 28 cm (11 in) and 26–31 cm (10–12 in) long respectively; rays found around Lakes Entrance, Victoria apparently have a smaller maturation size than those elsewhere.

== Human interactions ==
The greenback stingaree and the sandyback stingaree (U. bucculentus) are the most common stingarees in the trawl bycatch of the Southern and Eastern Scalefish and Shark Fishery (SESSF), operating on the upper continental slope off New South Wales. The New South Wales Oceanic Prawn Trawl Fishery and the Queensland East Coast Trawl Fishery also operate within the geographical and depth range of this species. Because of its deepwater habits, the greenback stingaree is unlikely to survive capture, and the process also often causes it to abort any gestating young. Though specific data is lacking, between 1976–77 and 1996–97, stingaree numbers on New South Wales upper slope fell by some two-thirds. Given these declines and the continuing intensity of fishing activities within its range, the International Union for Conservation of Nature (IUCN) has assessed this ray as Vulnerable. It would potentially benefit from the implementation of the 2004 Australian National Plan of Action for the Conservation and Management of Sharks.
