= Shirley Jeffrey =

Australian marine biologist

Shirley W. Jeffrey
- Shirley Jeffrey
- Born: Shirley Winifred Jeffrey; 4 April 1930; Townsville, Queensland
- Died: 4 January 2014 (aged 84)
- Education: University of Sydney; King's College London
- Known for: Isolation and study of chlorophyll c
- Awards: Fellow of the Australian Academy of Science (FAA); Gilbert Morgan Smith Medal; Australian Centenary Medal; Shinkishi Hatai Medal; Member of the Order of Australia (AM)
- Scientific career
- Fields: Marine Biology; Plant Biology; Aquaculture
- Workplaces: CSIRO
- Author abbrev. (botany): S.W.Jeffrey

Shirley Winifred Jeffrey AM FAA (4 April 1930 – 4 January 2014) was an Australian marine biologist and naturalist, who researched biochemical separation techniques, specialising in micro-algal research; her discovery, isolation and purification of chlorophyll c allowed for the evaluation of oceanic microscopic plant biomass and photosynthesis. She was christened The Mother of chlorophyll c by one of her early mentors, Professor Andrew Benson of the Scripps Research Institute in San Diego.

== Early life and education ==
Jeffrey was born in Townsville, Queensland as the daughter of Tom Jeffrey and his wife, Dorothea (née Cherrington). During her younger years, she did not have a particular interest in science, preferring "playing with animals and dolls and helped my mother in the kitchen and loved cooking". While studying at Methodist Ladies College in Melbourne in the early 1940s, she was inspired by a "most memorable teacher", Connie Glass, who led her to be interested in studying the natural world.

Jeffrey completed her secondary schooling in Sydney at Wenona, and completed a Bachelor of Science degree in 1952 and a master's in 1954 at the University of Sydney. She completed a doctorate in biochemical pharmacology in 1958 at King's College, London.

== Scientific career ==
Dr Jeffrey returned to Australia in 1961 after completing her PhD, to work at the Division of Fisheries and Oceanography at CSIRO; it was during this time she researched pigmentation in microalgae, in 1962 becoming the first person to successfully isolate and purify the accessory pigment chlorophyll c previously known, but incompletely characterised, in various algae.

In 1965, she was aboard the maiden voyage of the scientific expedition on the Alpha Helix, the research vessel of Scripps Institution of Oceanography at the University of California, which was coming to Australia to study the ecology of the Great Barrier Reef. Her research led to a sabbatical at Scripps Institution of Oceanography in 1973; during this period she met Australian biologist and future husband Dr Andy Heron.

Between 1971 and 1977, Dr Jeffrey was a principal scientist at CSIRO's marine biochemistry unit, then a senior principal research scientist CSIRO Division of Fisheries and Oceanography (1977 to 1981) and then senior principal research scientist and then acting chief of CSIRO Division of Fisheries Research (1981–84). While at CSIRO she was in charge of developing the CSIRO's Collection of Living Microalgae (also known as the Algal Culture Collection). Her co-edited work Phytoplankton Pigments in Oceanography was published in 1996 by UNESCO.

== Awards ==
Throughout her career, she received many awards, in recognition of her work, including the 1988 Inaugural Jubilee Award from the Australian Marine Science Association; Fellow of the Australian Academy of Science (FAA) (1991) and she was appointed a Member of the Order of Australia (AM) in 1993. In 1991 she was awarded the Clarke Medal by the Royal Society of New South Wales.

In 2000, Jeffrey received the Gilbert Morgan Smith Medal from the United States National Academy of Sciences, the first person outside the United States to receive this Medal, and was later elected as a foreign associate of the US National Academy of Sciences. In 2003, she was awarded the Australian Centenary Medal, and in 2007 she received the Shinkishi Hatai Medal at the 21st Pacific Science Congress in Okinawa, Japan.

She was a member, Fellow and former Council member of Jane Franklin Hall, a college of the University of Tasmania and an office-bearer of the Royal Society of Tasmania. In 2012, several of her colleagues recognised her achievements in "Tribute to Shirley Jeffrey: 50 years of research on chlorophyll c" published in Phycologia (Volume 51, 2: 123–125). Despite retiring in 1995, Dr Jeffrey continued to research and publish as an honorary research fellow with the CSIRO until her death in 2014, and was an accomplished violinist in the Hobart Chamber Orchestra.
