= Kai stingaree =

Conservation status
- Data Deficient (IUCN 3.1)

Scientific classification
- Kingdom: Animalia
- Phylum: Chordata
- Class: Chondrichthyes
- Subclass: Elasmobranchii
- Order: Myliobatiformes
- Family: Urolophidae
- Genus: Urolophus
- Species: U. kaianus

Binomial name
- Urolophus kaianus Günther, 1880

Species of cartilaginous fish

The Kai stingaree (Urolophus kaianus) is a species of stingray in the family Urolophidae, known only from two juveniles collected from 236 m (774 ft) deep in the Kai Islands of eastern Indonesia. This species has a rhomboid pectoral fin with a very blunt, rounded snout, and a tail with lateral skin folds, a leaf-shaped caudal fin, and no dorsal fin. It is brown above with blackish coloring on the upper surface of each eyeball. The larger of the two specimens measures 23 cm (9.1 in) long. The International Union for Conservation of Nature (IUCN) does not yet have enough information to assess the Kai stingaree beyond Data Deficient. It presently faces little fishing, though this is liable to change in the future.

== Taxonomy ==
From September 9 to 29, 1874, the research ship HMS Challenger collected a number of hitherto-unknown fishes from Station 192 in the Kai Islands, including two specimens of the Kai stingaree. British zoologist Albert Günther wrote a brief description of the new species and published it in 1880, as part of the scientific reports that followed the Challenger expedition.

== Distribution and habitat ==
The two Kai stingaree specimens were collected over blue mud in the Kai Islands, at a depth of 236 m (774 ft). Given that no further specimens have emerged since the originals, it seems to be extremely rare and/or have a highly restricted range.

== Description ==
The pectoral fin disc of the Kai stingaree is diamond-shaped and much wider than long, with narrowly rounded outer corners. The leading margins of the disc converge at an obtuse angle on the snout, which is rounded and non-protruding. The eyes are immediately followed by teardrop-shaped spiracles. Between the nostrils is a skirt-shaped curtain of skin, whose posterior corners are extended into small lobes. The teeth are small, with roughly oval bases. The five pairs of gill slits are short, and the pelvic fins are small with rounded margins. The tail is slightly shorter than the disc, bearing a skin fold running along either side and a leaf-shaped caudal fin at the end. A serrated stinging spine is placed on top, about halfway along the tail's length; there is no dorsal fin. The skin is completely smooth. This species is a plain yellowish brown above, transitioning sharply to blackish on the upper surface of each eyeball. The two specimens are both juveniles, one measuring 22 cm (8.7 in) and the other 23 cm (9.1 in) in length.

== Biology and ecology ==
Virtually nothing is known of the natural history of the Kai stingaree. It is presumably aplacental viviparous with a small litter size, like other stingarees.

== Human interactions ==
The International Union for Conservation of Nature (IUCN) currently has insufficient data to assess the Kai stingaree beyond Data Deficient. Indonesian trawl fisheries do not presently operate below a depth of 200 m (660 ft), though this is anticipated to change in the future, at which time this species may be threatened.
