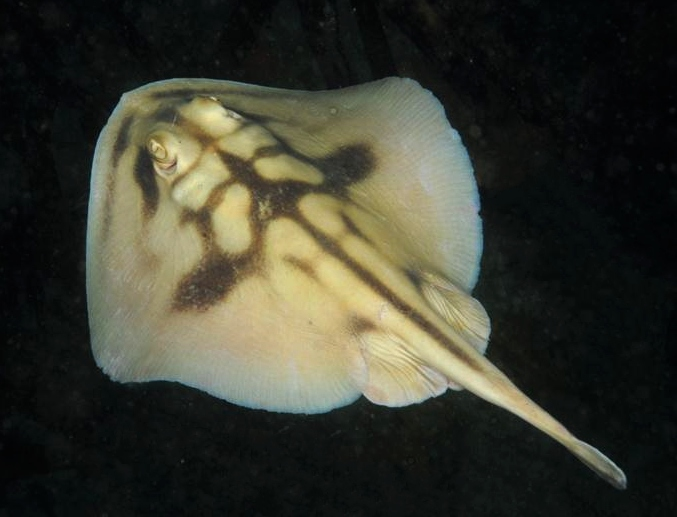

Conservation status
- Least Concern (IUCN 3.1)

Scientific classification
- Kingdom: Animalia
- Phylum: Chordata
- Class: Chondrichthyes
- Subclass: Elasmobranchii
- Order: Myliobatiformes
- Family: Urolophidae
- Genus: Urolophus
- Species: U. cruciatus

Binomial name
- Urolophus cruciatus (Lacépède, 1804)
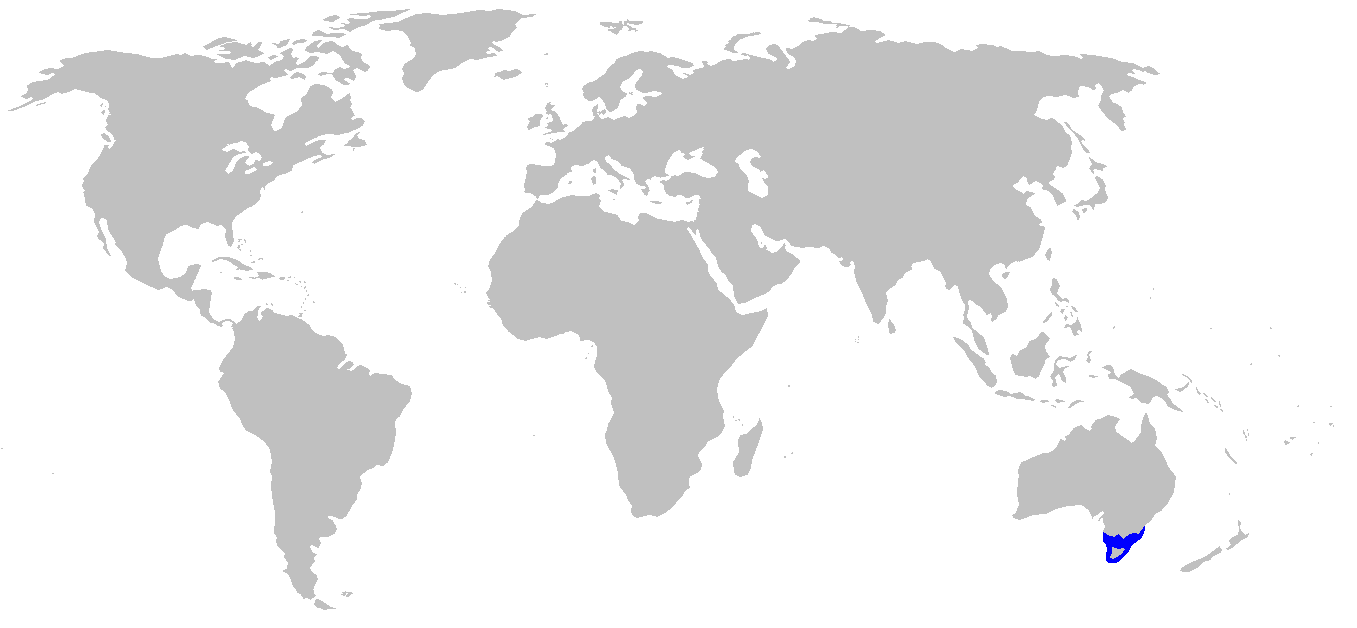
- Range of the crossback stingaree

Synonyms
- Raja cruciata Lacepède, 1804; Urolophus ephippiatus Richardson, 1845

= Crossback stingaree =

Species of cartilaginous fish

The crossback stingaree or banded stingaree (Urolophus cruciatus) is a species of stingray in the family Urolophidae. It is endemic to southeastern Australia, mainly off Victoria and Tasmania but also marginally to New South Wales and South Australia. This bottom-dwelling fish generally inhabits sand and reef habitats deeper than 100 m (330 ft) off Victoria, and muddy habitats in shallow bays and estuaries off Tasmania. Befitting its name, the crossback stingaree has a distinctive dark pattern on its back, consisting of a midline stripe that is crossed by three transverse bars. It has an oval pectoral fin disc with a blunt snout and a skirt-shaped curtain of skin between the nostrils. Its tail is short with no skin fold along the sides, and a deep, leaf-shaped caudal fin. The youngest rays may have a small dorsal fin in front of the stinging tail spine. This species reaches 50 cm (20 in) in length.

During the day the crossback stingaree is usually inactive and can be found partially or completely buried in sand on the sea floor. It is a carnivore and adults forage for crustaceans, polychaete worms and other small invertebrates on the seafloor. Juveniles feed on smaller crustaceans such as isopods, amphipods and shrimps.

The species is aplacental viviparous, with the developing embryos sustained to term by histotroph ("uterine milk") produced by the mother. Females bear litters of up to four pups every other year, after a gestation period of at least six months. This species is closely related to, and may hybridize with, the yellowback stingaree (U. sufflavus). The venomous sting of the crossback stingaree is potentially injurious to humans. This common species is seldom caught by commercial fisheries other than in the northernmost extent of its range. Thus, its population is largely secure and the International Union for Conservation of Nature (IUCN) has listed it under Least Concern.

== Taxonomy ==
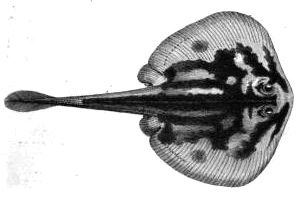
The illustration that accompanied Lacépède's 1804 description.

French naturalist Bernard Lacépède originally described the crossback stingaree as Raja cruciata, in an 1804 volume of the scientific journal Annales du Muséum d'Histoire Naturelle Paris. The specific epithet means "cross-like" in Latin, referring to the distinctive markings on its back. The origin of the type specimen was given simply as New Holland (Australia). In their 1838–41 Systematische Beschreibung der Plagiostomen, German biologists Johannes Müller and Jakob Henle placed this species in the newly created genus Urolophus.

The Victorian and Tasmanian subpopulations of the crossback stingaree differ markedly in habitat preferences and merit further taxonomic investigation, according to the International Union for Conservation of Nature (IUCN). This ray is closely related to the yellowback stingaree (U. sufflavus). In addition to morphological similarities, the two may also hybridize (see below) and, in a 2007 study of 388 fishes by Robert Ward and Bronwyn Holmes, were the only species that could not be distinguished on the basis of their cytochrome c gene sequences, attesting to a close evolutionary relationship.

== Distribution and habitat ==
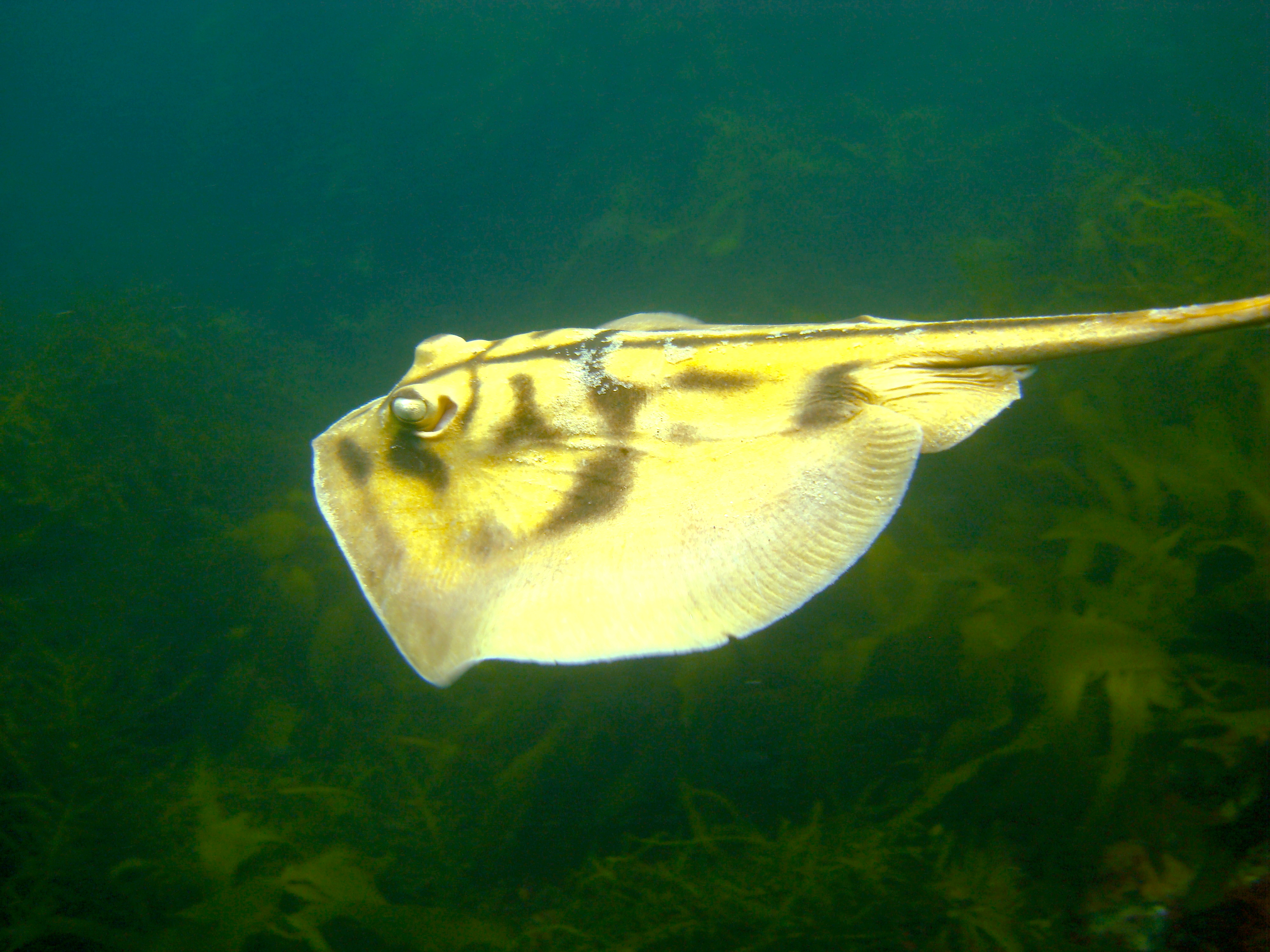
The crossback stingaree is found close to the sea floor.

The distribution of the crossback stingaree mainly encompasses the coastal waters of Victoria and Tasmania, where it is quite abundant; it ranges as far east as Jervis Bay in New South Wales, and as far west as Beachport in South Australia. Bottom-dwelling in nature, this species has been reported from the intertidal zone to a depth of 210 m (690 ft) on the upper continental slope. Rays of the Victorian subpopulation prefer sandy flats and rocky reefs and are seldom seen in less than 25 m (82 ft) of water, occurring most commonly at depths greater than 100 m (330 ft). By contrast, rays of the Tasmanian subpopulation are usually found over muddy bottoms in very shallow bays and large estuaries, occasionally penetrating into brackish water.

== Description ==
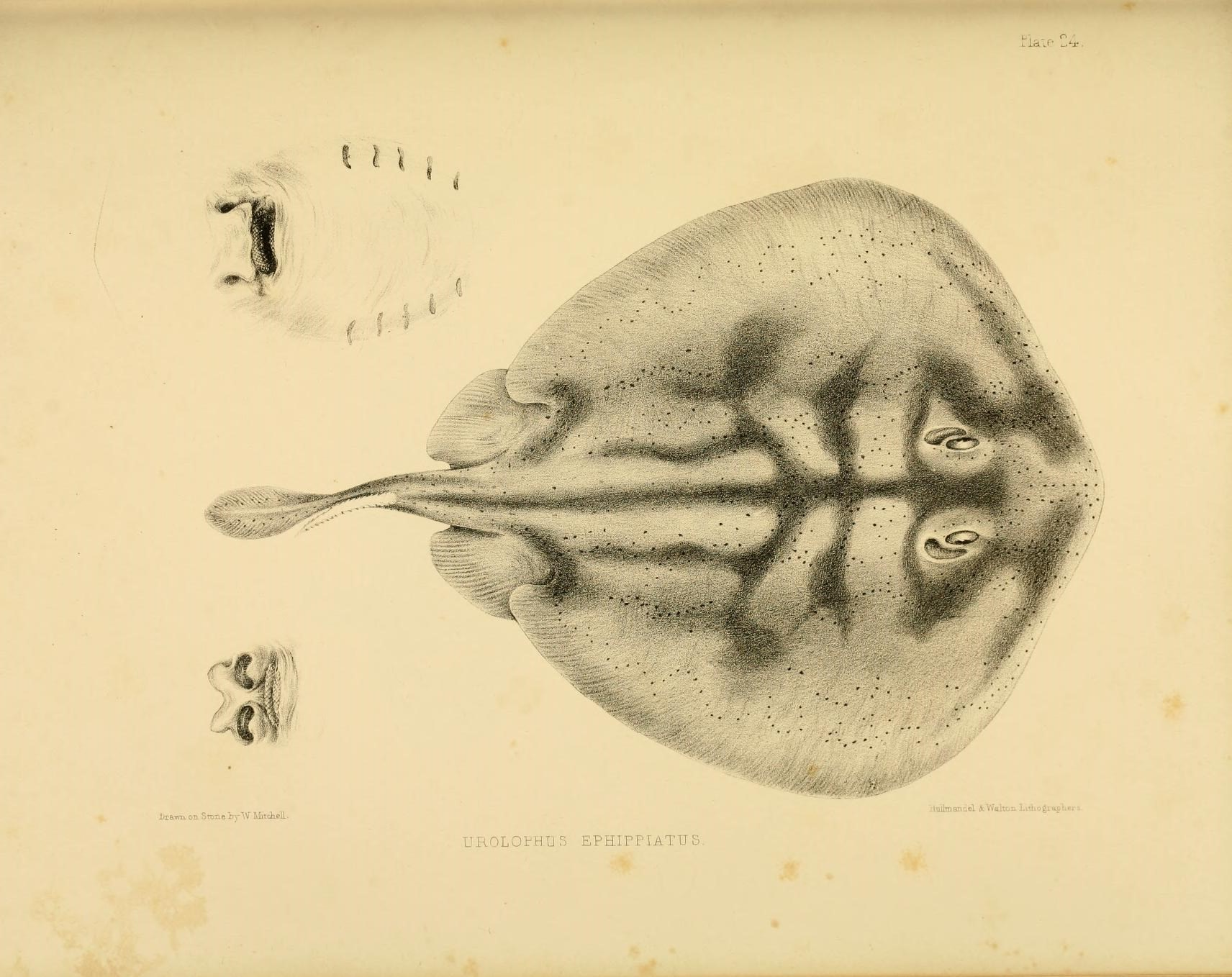
Illustration of anatomy.

The crossback stingaree's pectoral fin disc is slightly wider than long and oval in shape, with the anterior margins nearly straight and converging at a very obtuse angle. The snout is fleshy and blunt, generally not protruding from the disc. The eyes are small and immediately followed by teardrop-shaped spiracles, which have rounded to angular posterior rims. The outer rim of each nostril may form a small knob at the back. Between the nostrils is a skirt-shaped curtain of skin with a deeply fringed posterior margin. The mouth is small and strongly arched, containing 3–6 papillae (nipple-like structures) on the floor and an additional patch of papillae is present on the outside of the lower jaw. Both upper and lower teeth are small with roughly oval bases, and are arranged in a quincunx pattern. The five pairs of gill slits are short. The pelvic fins are small, with rounded margins.

The rather short tail measures 63–84% of the disc's length and is a flattened oval in cross-section, without lateral skin folds. A single serrated, stinging spine is positioned on top, about halfway along the tail's length. In newborns, the sting is preceded by a small dorsal fin; the fin is lost with age, though it may be evidenced by a small ridge or scar. At the end of the tail is a very short, deep, leaf-shaped caudal fin. The skin is entirely devoid of dermal denticles. The crossback stingaree is grayish to yellowish brown above with a pattern of dark markings, including a stripe running along the midline and crossed by three transverse bars: one near the eyes, one over the gill region, and one over the center of the disc. The pattern is strongest in rays from the southern portion of its range. A few dark brown or black individuals have been recorded. The underside is off-white, sometimes becoming slightly darker at the disc margin. The caudal fin is more grayish than the body, and there may be dusky blotches on the tail. This species attains a maximum known length of 50 cm (20 in). Females generally grow larger than males.

== Biology and ecology ==
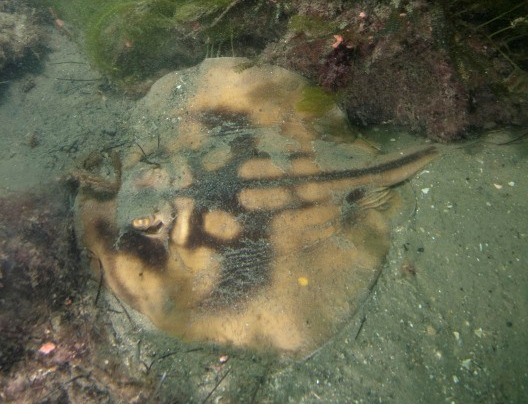
During the day, the crossback stingaree can often be found resting, partly or completely buried in sediment.

Generally nocturnal, the crossback stingaree spends long stretches of the day lying motionless on the sea floor, partially or completely buried in sediment. It has been known to form groups of varying size, sometimes mixing with other stingaree species. This ray is a generalist predator that forages for small organisms on or buried in the bottom. Off Victoria, over three-quarters of prey consumed are crustaceans, of which isopods (particularly Natalolana woodjonesi and N. wowine) comprise the majority and amphipods and decapods the remainder. Polychaete worms are also eaten in significant quantities, while priapulids and the burrowing squid Euprymna tasmanica are infrequently taken. Young rays under 30 cm (12 in) across feed mainly on smaller isopods, amphipods, and shrimps; with age a progressively greater diversity of larger prey, such as penaeid prawns, priapulids, and polychaetes, are incorporated into its diet.

The broadnose sevengill shark (Notorynchus cepedianus) is known to prey on the crossback stingaree. When threatened, this ray raises its tail warningly above its body in a scorpion-like fashion. Parasites documented from this species include a tapeworm in the genus Acanthobothrium, and the monogenean Calicotyle urolophi. Like other stingrays, the crossback stingaree is aplacental viviparous: when the developing embryos exhaust their supply of yolk, their mother provisions them with nutrient-rich histotroph ("uterine milk") through specialized extensions of the uterine epithelium called "trophonemata". Females produce litters of 1–4 pups every other year. Embryonic development proceeds rapidly over a six-month period, though the total gestation period may be much longer if there is a period of dormancy for the eggs after fertilization, as has been reported in other stingarees. Off Tasmania, large estuaries such as at the mouth of the River Derwent serve as nursery areas.

Different authors have variously reported the birth length at between 10 and 15 cm (3.9 and 5.9 in), and the maturation length at between 20 and 32 cm (7.9 and 12.6 in), with females usually maturing at a slightly larger size than males. This range of sizes may reflect life history differences in crossback stingarees across different parts of its range. Both sexes mature at around six years of age, and can live to at least 11 years. The crossback stingaree may hybridize naturally with the closely related yellowback stingaree off southern New South Wales, where the distributions of the two species overlap and apparent hybrid offspring with intermediate colour patterns have been found. If true, this would represent one of the few known cases of hybridization among cartilaginous fishes.

== Human interactions ==
The crossback stingaree can inflict an excruciating injury on an unwary human with its venomous sting, that may require surgical intervention if the serrated tip of the sting breaks off inside the wound. The base of its tail is highly flexible, allowing it to strike a person touching any part of its body. In the 19th century, the hazard posed by this species led to persecution by fishery workers in the form of "spiking", in which a metal spike is used to pierce the ray's cranium and remove it from the net. The IUCN has listed the crossback stingaree under Least Concern, as it is exposed to minimal fishing activity in the Bass Strait and off western Tasmania, which constitute most of its distribution. The impact of Tasmanian inshore fisheries is unquantified but unlikely to be severe. Off New South Wales, it is caught incidentally in otter trawls and gillnets used by the Southern and Eastern Scalefish and Shark Fishery (SESSF). Captured rays likely experience high mortality, and also tend to abort any unborn young. While the SESSF has caused an overall decline in deepwater stingarees within its area of operations, it only affects a small portion of this species' range.
