= Brown stingaree =

Conservation status
- Least Concern (IUCN 3.1)

Scientific classification
- Kingdom: Animalia
- Phylum: Chordata
- Class: Chondrichthyes
- Subclass: Elasmobranchii
- Order: Myliobatiformes
- Family: Urolophidae
- Genus: Urolophus
- Species: U. westraliensis

Binomial name
- Urolophus westraliensis Last & M. F. Gomon, 1987

Species of fish

The brown stingaree (Urolophus westraliensis) is a little-known species of stingray in the family Urolophidae, found at a depth of 60–220 m (200–720 ft) on the outer continental shelf off northern Western Australia. This species has a rhomboid pectoral fin disc colored light yellow or brown, sometimes with three faint, darker, transverse bars. Its nostrils have a skirt-shaped curtain of skin between them. Its tail ends in a leaf-shaped caudal fin and either lacks or has poorly developed lateral skin folds and a dorsal fin. The maximum known length is 36 cm (14 in). The International Union for Conservation of Nature (IUCN) has listed the brown stingaree under Least Concern, as there is negligible fishing pressure across most of its range.

== Taxonomy ==
Peter Last and Martin Gomon described the brown stingaree in a 1987 issue of Memoirs of the National Museum of Victoria. The type specimen is a male 19 cm (7.5 in) across, trawled from north of Port Hedland in Western Australia (hence the specific epithet westraliensis) by the FRV Soela on 2 April 1982. This species is closely related to the mitotic stingaree (U. mitosis).

== Distribution and habitat ==
Endemic to northern Western Australia, the brown stingaree is found over the outer continental shelf between the Dampier and Bonaparte Archipelagos. It is a benthic species that has been reported from a depth of 60–220 m (200–720 ft).

== Description ==
The pectoral fin disc of the brown stingaree is diamond-shaped and slightly wider than long, with broadly rounded outer corners. The anterior margins are nearly straight and converge at an obtuse angle on the snout, which protrudes slightly from the disc. The eyes are of modest size and followed by teardrop-shaped spiracles with rounded posterior rims. The outer rim of each nostril may form a knob at the back. Between the nostrils is skirt-shaped curtain of skin, with a posterior margin that is very shallowly fringed and extended into small lobes each corner. There are 5–6 small papillae (nipple-like structures) on the floor of the fairly large mouth, along with a few papillae on the lower jaw. The small teeth have roughly oval bases. The five pairs of gill slits are short, and the pelvic fins are small and rounded.

The tail is rather short, measuring 66–80% as long as the disc, with a serrated stinging spine on top about halfway along its length and a short, deep, leaf-shaped caudal fin at the end. There may be subtle traces of a lateral skin fold on either side and a dorsal fin in front of the sting. The skin is completely smooth. The upper surface is light yellow or brown in adults and light yellow in juveniles; there may be faint, darker bars running across the eyes, the gill region, and the middle of the back. The underside is whitish, and the caudal fin is yellow with a black margin. The largest known specimen measures 36 cm (14 in).

== Biology and ecology ==
Little is known of the natural history of the brown stingaree. Reproduction is aplacental viviparous, with the developing embryos sustained by histotroph ("uterine milk") produced by the mother. The litter size is probably small, as in related species. Newborns measure 10–13 cm (3.9–5.1 in) long; males mature sexually at under 24 cm (9.4 in) long.

== Human interactions ==
The range of the brown stingaree borders the area utilized by the North West Slope Trawl Fishery (NWSTF), but otherwise it faces no significant fishing pressure. Consequently, the International Union for Conservation of Nature (IUCN) has listed this species under Least Concern. Its population may have been affected by intensive foreign trawl fisheries that operated in the region from 1959 to 1990. It would potentially benefit from the implementation of the 2004 Australian National Plan of Action for the Conservation and Management of Sharks.
