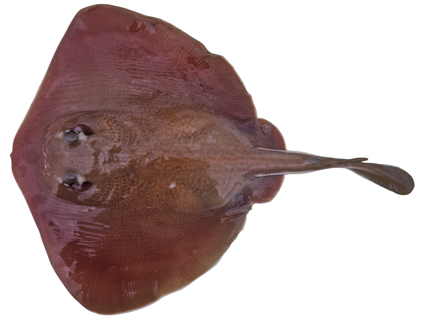

Conservation status
- Vulnerable (IUCN 3.1)

Scientific classification
- Kingdom: Animalia
- Phylum: Chordata
- Class: Chondrichthyes
- Subclass: Elasmobranchii
- Order: Myliobatiformes
- Family: Urolophidae
- Genus: Urolophus
- Species: U. bucculentus

Binomial name
- Urolophus bucculentus Macleay, 1884

= Sandyback stingaree =

Species of cartilaginous fish

The sandyback stingaree or great stingaree (Urolophus bucculentus) is a little-known species of stingray in the family Urolophidae, endemic to southeastern Australia. It is generally found offshore around the edge of the continental shelf, at a depth of 65–265 m (213–869 ft). A relatively large species reaching 89 cm (35 in) long, the sandyback stingaree has a diamond-shaped pectoral fin disc wider than long, usually with a dorsal pattern of numerous fine lighter marks on a yellowish to brownish background. Its short tail terminates in a deep, leaf-shaped caudal fin, and bears a sizable dorsal fin just in front of the stinging spine.

A bottom-dwelling predator taking mostly crustaceans, the sandyback stingaree is aplacental viviparous: females supply their unborn young with histotroph ("uterine milk"), bearing up to five pups every other year following a 14–19-month gestation period. Significant numbers of this species are taken incidentally by commercial fisheries, primarily off New South Wales where overall stingaree populations have declined dramatically as a result. With fishing pressure still intense in the area, the International Union for Conservation of Nature (IUCN) has assessed the sandyback stingaree as Vulnerable.

== Taxonomy ==
Australian naturalist William John Macleay described the sandyback stingaree in an 1884 issue of Proceedings of the Linnean Society of New South Wales, based on specimens collected near Port Jackson in New South Wales. Within the genus, it seems to be most closely related to the patchwork stingaree (U. flavomosaicus) and the butterfly stingaree (U. papilio).

== Distribution and habitat ==
The sandyback stingaree is patchily distributed off southeastern Australia, from Beachport in South Australia to Tasmania, to Stradbroke Island off Queensland. This benthic ray generally inhabits areas with fine sediment on the outer continental shelf and upper continental slope, and rarely ventures inshore. It has been reported from between 65 and 265 m (213 and 869 ft) deep.

== Description ==
The sandyback stingaree has a diamond-shaped pectoral fin disc much wider than long, with rounded outer corners and nearly straight leading margins converging at an obtuse angle. The snout is fleshy and slightly protruding at the tip. The small eyes are closely followed by comma-shaped spiracles with angular to rounded posterior rims. The posterior rim of the nostrils sometimes bear a ridge, and between the nostrils is a skirt-shaped curtain of skin with a finely fringed trailing margin. The mouth is fairly large and contains small teeth with roughly oval bases, as well as 14–16 papillae (nipple-like structures) on the floor and a narrow patch of papillae on the lower jaw. The five pairs of gill slits are short. The pelvic fins are small, with rounded margins.

The tail is short, measuring 62–73% as long as the disc, and strongly flattened with a skin fold running along each side. The upper surface of the tail bears a serrated stinging spine, which is preceded by a relatively large dorsal fin. The caudal fin is lance-like, short, and deep. The skin is devoid of dermal denticles. This species is yellowish to brownish above; many individuals are patterned with small pale spots and reticulations. The dorsal and caudal fins are darker in juveniles, and may be mottled in adults. The underside is plain white, with black blotches beneath the tail in some individuals. The sandyback stingaree is the largest member of its family off southern Australia, growing to 89 cm (35 in) long.

== Biology and ecology ==
Ecologically, the sandyback stingaree is the temperate counterpart of the tropical patchwork stingaree. It preys primarily on crustaceans. Females have been known to use their stings to discourage unwanted suitors; one recorded specimen was found with a broken-off sting embedded in its back, that had been there for some time. Reproduction is aplacental viviparous, probably with the developing embryos sustained by maternally produced histotroph ("uterine milk") like in other stingrays. Females bear litters of 1–5 pups every other year, after a gestation period lasting 14–19 months. Newborn rays measure about 17 cm (6.7 in) long; males attain sexual maturity at around 40 cm (16 in) long and females at around 50 cm (20 in) long. Its large adult size suggests a relatively slow growth rate. A known parasite of this species is the monogenean Calicotyle urolophi.

== Human interactions ==
Along with the greenback stingaree (U. viridis), the sandyback stingaree contributes substantially to the stingaree bycatch of the Southern and Eastern Scalefish and Shark Fishery (SESSF) operating off New South Wales; it may also be caught incidentally by the Oceanic Prawn Trawl Fishery and other fisheries in the area. It faces less fishing pressure in the Bass Strait and off western Tasmania. This ray is edible but not marketed, and may be persecuted by fishery workers as its sting makes it hard to handle. Though specific data is lacking, trawl surveys have shown that stingaree catches from the New South Wales upper continental slope declined over 65% between 1976–77 and 1996–77. Given that SESSF activity within its range remains high, the International Union for Conservation of Nature (IUCN) has assessed the sandyback stingaree as Vulnerable. This species would potentially benefit from the implementation of the 2004 Australian National Plan of Action for the Conservation and Management of Sharks.
