= Patchwork stingaree =

Conservation status
- Least Concern (IUCN 3.1)

Scientific classification
- Kingdom: Animalia
- Phylum: Chordata
- Class: Chondrichthyes
- Subclass: Elasmobranchii
- Order: Myliobatiformes
- Family: Urolophidae
- Genus: Urolophus
- Species: U. flavomosaicus

Binomial name
- Urolophus flavomosaicus Last & M. F. Gomon, 1987

Species of cartilaginous fish

The patchwork stingaree (Urolophus flavomosaicus) is a little-known species of stingray in the family Urolophidae, with a disjunct distribution off northwestern and northeastern Australia. It typically inhabits the outer continental shelf, at a depth of 60–320 m (200–1,050 ft). This species has a diamond-shaped pectoral fin disc much wider than it is long, and a short, flattened tail with a prominent dorsal fin and leaf-like caudal fin. There is a skirt-shaped curtain of skin between its nostrils. Its dorsal colour pattern resembles a mosaic of dark brown rings with light-coloured centers, separated by fine reticulated lines. The International Union for Conservation of Nature (IUCN) has listed the patchwork stingaree under Least Concern, as it is subject to minimal fishing pressure.

== Taxonomy ==
Peter Last and Martin Gomon described the patchwork stingaree in a 1987 issue of Memoirs of the National Museum of Victoria, giving it the specific epithet flavomosaicus from the Latin flavus ("yellow") and mosaicus ("mosaic") in reference to its colouration. A male 33 cm (13 in) across, collected north of Port Hedland, Western Australia on 21 April 1982, by the research trawler FRV Soela, was designated as the type specimen. It seems to be most closely related to the sandyback stingaree (U. bucculentus) and the butterfly stingaree (U. papilio).

== Distribution and habitat ==
The patchwork stingaree is a northern Australian endemic with a discontinuous range: the western population is found from the Houtman Abrolhos to Cape Leveque in Western Australia, and the eastern population from Caloundra to Townsville in Queensland. It seems to be rather patchily distributed, with only small numbers of individuals present at any particular location. This benthic species is mostly found over fine substrates on the outer continental shelf, and has been reported from 60 to 320 m (200 to 1,050 ft) deep.

== Description ==
Among the largest members of its family, the patchwork stingaree can grow to at least 59 cm (23 in) long. It has a diamond-shaped pectoral fin disc much wider than long, with broadly rounded outer corners and nearly straight anterior margins that converge at an obtuse angle. The tip of the snout protrudes slightly past the disc. The small eyes are followed by comma-shaped spiracles with angular posterior rims. The outer rim of each nostril may be enlarged into a small knob; between the nostrils is a skirt-shaped curtain of skin with a finely fringed trailing margin. There are 8–14 stubby papillae (nipple-like structures) on the floor of the large mouth, as well as a narrow patch of large papillae on the lower jaw. The teeth are small with roughly oval bases, and the five pairs of gill slits are short. The pelvic fins are small with curved margins.

The short, very flattened tail measures 67–79% as long as the disc and terminates in a short, deep, leaf-shaped caudal fin. A lateral skin fold runs along the each side of the tail, which is most obvious in juveniles. The upper surface of the tail bears a rather large dorsal fin followed by a serrated stinging spine. The skin entirely lacks dermal denticles. The dorsal colouration of this species is distinctive, consisting of a yellowish background with numerous large, dark brown rings surrounding light-coloured spots, that may be separated from each other by a network of fine pale lines (particularly at the center of the disc) to give the impression of a mosaic. The rings become smaller and less well-defined towards the margins of the disc. The dorsal and caudal fins are light in adults and dark with nearly black margins in juveniles.

== Biology and ecology ==
Virtually nothing is known of the natural history of the patchwork stingaree. Ecologically, it is apparently the tropical equivalent of the temperate sandyback stingaree. Reproduction is presumably aplacental viviparous like in other stingrays, with the developing embryos sustained by maternally produced histotroph ("uterine milk"). The litter size is probably small, judging by related species. Males mature sexually at under 38 cm (15 in) long.

== Human interactions ==
Only the Coral Sea Fishery (CSF) off Queensland and the Western Trawl Fisheries (WTF) off Western Australia regularly operate within the geographical and depth range occupied by the patchwork stingaree. Both fisheries have a negligible impact on this species because of their small scale, and are unlikely to expand in the near future. As a result, the International Union for Conservation of Nature (IUCN) has listed the patchwork stingaree under Least Concern. It would potentially benefit from the implementation of the 2004 Australian National Plan of Action for the Conservation and Management of Sharks.
