= RV Soela =

European/Australian stern trawler (ship)

- Soela following refit for CSIRO use, c.1980

History
- Name: La Canche (1965–77); Soela (1977–94); Anjasmara II (1994–??)
- Owner: ?? (1965–77); KFV Fisheries (1977–??)
- Operator: ?? (1965–77); KFV Fisheries (1977–??)
- Builder: AG Weser
- Launched: 1965
- Identification: IMO number: 6505545
- Fate: not known (?out of service as at 2010)

General characteristics
- Type: Fishing trawler, Research vessel
- Tonnage: 693 GRT
- Length: 173 ft 2 in (52.78 m)
- Beam: 31 ft 3 in (9.53 m)
- Installed power: 2 Deutz diesel engines / 2 Siemens electric propulsion motors
- Propulsion: Screw propeller

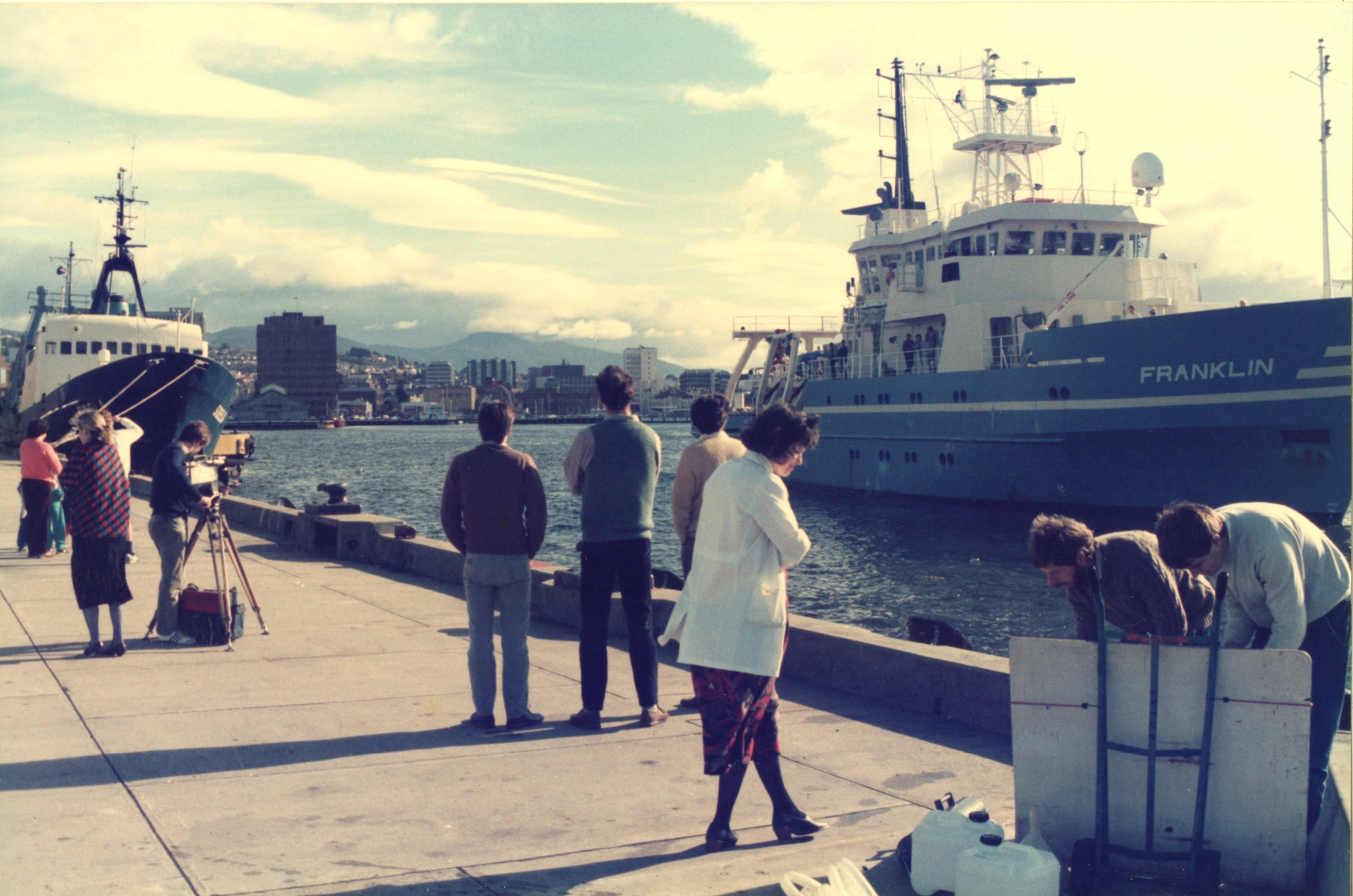
CSIRO wharf, Hobart with research vessels Soela (at left) and Franklin, June 1986

RV Soela (sometimes cited as FRV Soela) was a stern trawler that was built in 1965 as La Canche by AG Weser, Bremen for French owners. She was sold in 1977 and renamed Soela, to be used as a charter research vessel for the CSIRO Division of Fisheries and Oceanography (later: CSIRO Division of Fisheries) in Australian waters. After 10 years of CSIRO charter (1979–1989) she was returned to her Australian owners. In 1994 she was re-named the Anjasmara II; her additional history beyond this point is not established, but she may have continued service until 2010.

== Description ==
The ship was built in 1965 by AG Weser, Bremen. The ship was 173 feet 2 inches (52.78 m) long, with a beam of 31 feet 3 inches (9.53 m). She had a GRT of 693. The ship was propelled by two Deutz diesel engines, coupled to two Siemens electric propulsion motors driving a variable pitch propeller, achieving an average maximum speed of 13 knots. A detailed description of the vessel as refitted for fisheries research by CSIRO is given in Maxwell, 1980.

== History ==
As La Canche, the vessel was built for commercial fishing operations in French waters. In 1979 she was purchased by an Australian company, KFV Fisheries (Qld) Pty Ltd, later under the name of the Soela Fishing Company, for charter to the CSIRO Division of Fisheries and Oceanography in Cronulla, New South Wales, as a replacement for the Division's previous research vessel, RV Courageous, which had completed 52 research cruises for the Division between 1975 and 1979. The vessel was renamed Soela, underwent a refit in Fremantle and entered service with CSIRO in November 1979, to coincide with declaration of the then newly declared 200 nautical mile Australian Fishing Zone, with an official handover in 1980. For CSIRO, she carried out 60 fishery surveys in regions including the Australian North West Shelf, the Great Australian Bight and in waters off Tasmania. She was fitted for both demersal (=bottom) and pelagic (=midwater) trawling and, in addition to the ship's crew, had accommodation for 11 scientists. She performed her last cruise for CSIRO in 1979; fisheries research activities were then transferred to a newly purchased, refitted research vessel, RV Southern Surveyor. Some time following her cessation of activities for CSIRO, she was re-named Anjasmara II in 1994; her further history is not known at this time but she may have been active until c.2010.

== Science data access ==
Access to science data from 60 voyages of the Soela is provided via the "Data Trawler" application of the CSIRO NCMI (National Collections and Marine Infrastructure) Information and Data Centre.
