= Mitotic stingaree =

Conservation status
- Least Concern (IUCN 3.1)

Scientific classification
- Kingdom: Animalia
- Phylum: Chordata
- Class: Chondrichthyes
- Subclass: Elasmobranchii
- Order: Myliobatiformes
- Family: Urolophidae
- Genus: Urolophus
- Species: U. mitosis

Binomial name
- Urolophus mitosis Last & M. F. Gomon, 1987

Species of cartilaginous fish

The mitotic stingaree (Urolophus mitosis) or blotched stingaree, is a little-known species of stingray in the family Urolophidae, so named because it has light blue blotches on its back that resemble cells undergoing mitotic division. Though not uncommon, it is found only in a small area of the outer continental shelf off northwestern Australia, at around 200 m (660 ft) down. This species attains a length of 29 cm (11 in) long and has a diamond-shaped pectoral fin disc with broadly rounded corners and a skirt-shaped curtain of skin between the nostrils. Its tail has subtle skin folds running along either side, no dorsal fin, and a slender leaf-shaped caudal fin. The International Union for Conservation of Nature (IUCN) has listed the mitotic stingaree under Least Concern, as there is little fishing within its range.

== Taxonomy ==
The mitotic stingaree was described by Peter Last and Martin Gomon in a 1987 issue of Memoirs of the National Museum of Victoria, in which they gave it the specific epithet mitosis (derived from the Greek mitos, meaning "thread") in reference to its unique color pattern. The type specimen is a female 15 cm (5.9 in) across, collected by the research trawler FRV Soela on 2 April 1982. A close relative is the brown stingaree (U. westraliensis).

== Distribution and habitat ==
The mitotic stingaree has only been reported from a small area north of Port Hedland in Western Australia, where it is fairly common. This benthic ray is found over fine sediment at the edge of the continental shelf, around 200 m (660 ft) deep.

== Description ==
The pectoral fin disc of the mitotic stingaree is more or less diamond-shaped and slightly wider than long. The leading margins are nearly straight, while the outer corners and trailing margins are rounded. The snout forms an obtuse angle, with the tip extending slightly past the disc. The eyes are large and followed by the spiracles, which are comma-shaped with rounded or angular posterior rims. There may be a small knob on the posterior corner of each nostril. Between the nostrils is a skirt-shaped curtain of skin with a subtly fringed trailing margin, which is drawn out into lobes at either corner. The mouth is somewhat large with 3–4 papillae (nipple-like structures) on the floor; a few papillae are also present on the lower jaw. The teeth are small with roughly oval bases, and the five pairs of gill slits are short. The pelvic fins are small and rounded.

The slender tail is strongly flattened and bears a subtle skin fold along each side; it measures 85–104% as long as the disc. A serrated stinging spine is positioned atop the tail about halfway along its length; the caudal fin is elongated and lance-like. The skin is entirely smooth. The upper surface of the disc is light green, becoming reddish towards the margins, and adorned by several large, light blue blotches outlined and filled with tiny dots, such as that they resemble cells during mitosis. The blotches are variable in shape but evenly spaced. The underside and caudal fin are uniformly light. The largest known specimen measures 29 cm (11 in) long.

== Biology and ecology ==
Virtually nothing is known of the natural history of the mitotic stingaree. It is presumably aplacental viviparous, with the developing embryos sustained by histotroph ("uterine milk") produced by the mother, like other stingrays. The litter size is probably small, as in related species. Males reach sexual maturity at a length of 25 cm (9.8 in).

== Human interactions ==
The mitotic stingaree occurs within the management area of the North West Slope Trawl Fishery, but little actual fishing occurs within its range and this is unlikely to change in the future. Therefore, the IUCN has listed this species under Least Concern. It would potentially benefit from the implementation of the 2004 Australian National Plan of Action for the Conservation and Management of Sharks.
