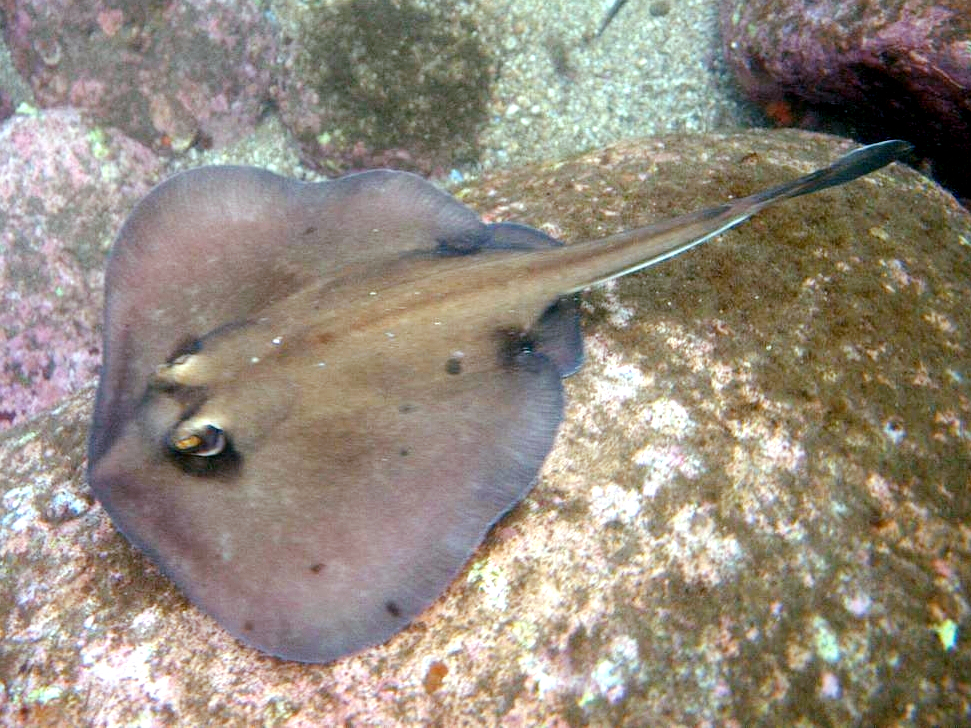

Conservation status
- Near Threatened (IUCN 3.1)

Scientific classification
- Kingdom: Animalia
- Phylum: Chordata
- Class: Chondrichthyes
- Subclass: Elasmobranchii
- Order: Myliobatiformes
- Family: Urolophidae
- Genus: Urolophus
- Species: U. kapalensis

Binomial name
- Urolophus kapalensis Yearsley & Last, 2006

= Kapala stingaree =

Species of cartilaginous fish

The Kapala stingaree (Urolophus kapalensis) is a species of stingray in the family Urolophidae, endemic to inshore waters off southeastern Queensland and New South Wales. It is commonly found on and around rocky reefs at a depth of 10–130 m (33–427 ft). Reaching 51 cm (20 in) in length, the Kapala stingaree has a rounded, diamond-shaped pectoral fin disc and a slender tail, which ends in a leaf-shaped caudal fin and bears lateral skin folds and a small dorsal fin in front of the stinging spine. It has a distinctive bell-shaped curtain of skin between its nostrils. This species is greenish above, with a highly variable pattern of dark markings usually found outside and between the eyes, and over the back and tail.

Crustaceans, in particular shrimp and amphipods, constitute the predominant prey of the Kapala stingaree; small bony fishes and polychaete worms are also eaten. It is aplacental viviparous, with females normally gestating only one pup at a time, and provisioning it with histotroph ("uterine milk"). The International Union for Conservation of Nature (IUCN) has assessed this species as Near Threatened; it is regularly taken incidentally by commercial fisheries, and is unlikely to be resilient against fishing pressure due to its low fecundity and propensity for aborting its young when captured.

== Taxonomy ==
Commonwealth Scientific and Industrial Research Organisation (CSIRO) researchers Gordon Yearsley and Peter Last described the Kapala stingaree, previously termed Urolophus "sp. A", in a 2006 issue of the scientific journal Zootaxa. They named the new species in honor of the research ship FRV Kapala, which conducted a series of fishery surveys off New South Wales in 1980s and 1990s that contributed substantially to ichthyological knowledge. On November 14, 1984, the Kapala collected the type specimen of this species, an adult male 35 cm (14 in) long, from the Tasman Sea off Jervis Bay. This ray may also be referred to as the banded stingaree.

== Distribution and habitat ==
The range of the Kapala stingaree is limited to the eastern coast of Australia, between Cape Moreton in Queensland to Disaster Bay in New South Wales. This benthic, inshore species has been reported between the depths of 10 and 130 m (33 and 427 ft). Off Queensland, it is common in water deeper than 62 m (203 ft), while off New South Wales it is rare north of the Clarence River, and common south of it in water shallower than 50 m (160 ft). The Kapala stingaree prefers rocky reefs and adjacent sandy flats, as well as seagrass beds.

== Description ==
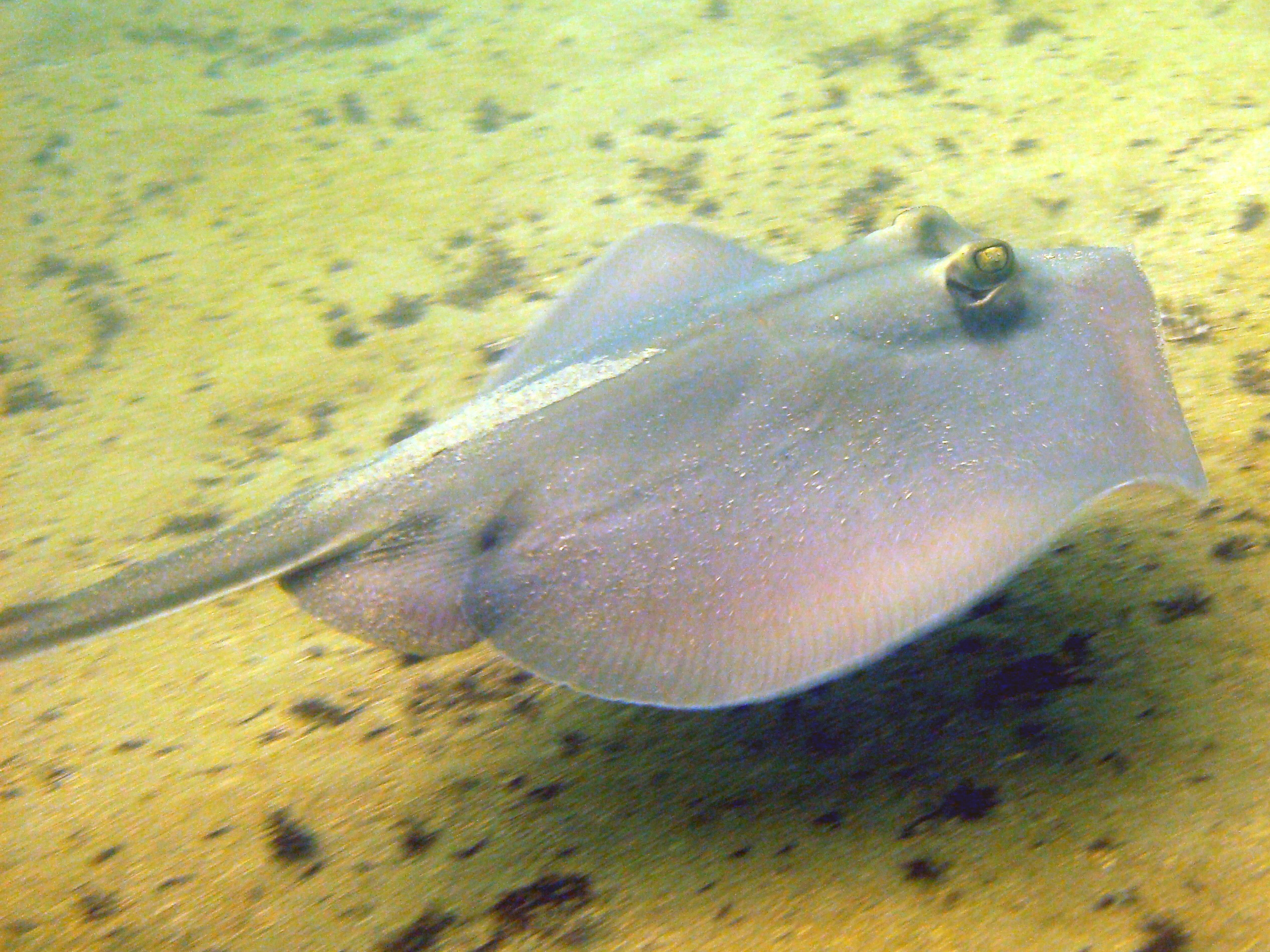
The Kapala stingaree has black markings around its eyes and prominent lateral skin folds on its tail.

The pectoral fin disc of the Kapala stingaree is more or less diamond-shaped with rounded outer corners and posterior margins, and is slightly wider than long. The leading margins of the disc are nearly straight and converge at an obtuse angle on the fleshy, barely protruding snout. The eyes are of modest size and followed by teardrop-shaped spiracles with rounded posterior rims. There is a subtle knob on the rear margin of each nostril. Between the nostrils is a bell-shaped curtain of skin, with the posterior margin shallowly fringed and corners elongated into lobes; only the sparsely-spotted stingaree (U. paucimaculatus) has a similarly shaped nasal curtain. The mouth is small and contains 5–7 papillae (nipple-like structure) arranged in a W-shaped pattern on the floor. The lower jaw also bears a patch of prominent papillae, arranged to form a series of transverse ridges. The teeth have rhomboid bases and are arranged in a quincunx pattern; the crowns are blunt for teeth at the sides of the jaws, becoming higher and more pointed towards the middle of the jaw. There are 25 upper and 31–32 lower tooth rows. The five pairs of gill slits are S-shaped. The pelvic fins are small with rounded rear margins; males have short, stout claspers.

The slender, flattened tail measures 82–90% as long as the disc, and terminates in a low, leaf-shaped caudal fin; there is a prominent skin fold running along each side. A very thin, serrated stinging spine is positioned atop the tail about halfway along its length; immediate in front is a long, low dorsal fin. The skin entirely lacks dermal denticles. The Kapala stingaree is greenish above, becoming pinkish toward the disc margins, and bears a variable pattern of dark markings that usually include a triangular blotch beneath each eye, a V-shaped bar between the eyes, a blotch at the base of the pelvic fins, and a pair of blotches in the middle of the disc that extend into stripes that run onto the tail. Not all individuals have all of these markings, and a few may be mottled or almost black on top. The underside is off-white with a wide, dusky band around the disc margin. The tail is pale with a dark midline stripe above and sometimes scattered dark blotches below; the dorsal fin is greenish and the caudal fin is light with a dark edge in adults, and entirely dark in juveniles. The largest known specimen measures 51 cm (20 in) long.

== Biology and ecology ==
The Kapala stingaree feeds primarily on benthic shrimp (mainly palaemonids) and amphipods (mainly ampeliscids), which together make up some 70% of its diet by volume. Important secondary prey are penaeid prawns and small bony fishes, while crabs, polychaete worms, and isopods are rarely consumed. Dietary composition is largely consistent across all ages, though older rays tend to consume proportionately more amphipods and fewer shrimp than younger rays. Like other stingrays, this species is aplacental viviparous with the developing embryos sustained by histotroph ("uterine milk") produced by the mother. Typically a litter consists of only a single pup, born at around 15 cm (5.9 in) long. Males reach sexual maturity at around 28–31 cm (11–12 in) long.

== Human interactions ==
Significant numbers of Kapala stingarees are caught incidentally in prawn trawls utilized by the Queensland East Coast Trawl Fishery (ECTF) and the New South Wales Ocean Trawl Fishery (OTF), which may have led to a decline in this species as has been documented for other stingarees in the region. Given its small distribution, low reproductive rate, and tendency to abort its young when captured, the International Union for Conservation of Nature (IUCN) has assessed the Kapala stingaree as Near Threatened. It does not appear to have benefited from the installation of Turtle Exclusion Devices (TEDs).
