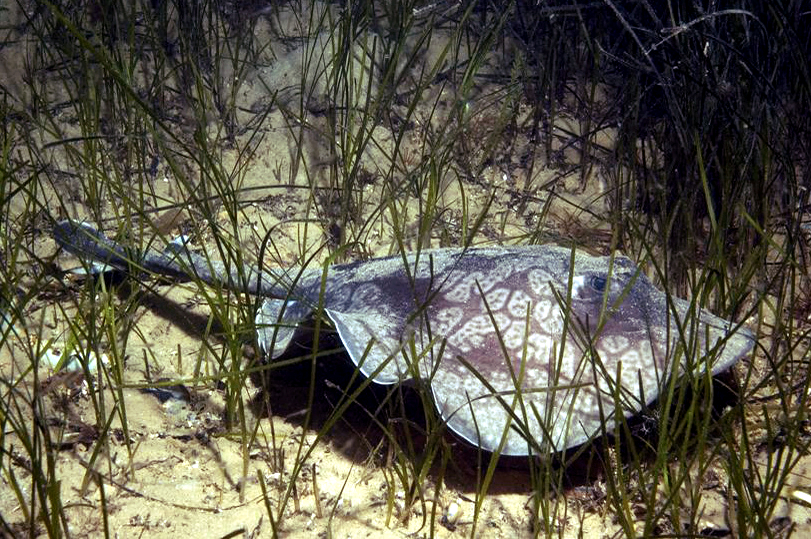

Conservation status
- Least Concern (IUCN 3.1)

Scientific classification
- Kingdom: Animalia
- Phylum: Chordata
- Class: Chondrichthyes
- Subclass: Elasmobranchii
- Order: Myliobatiformes
- Family: Urolophidae
- Genus: Urolophus
- Species: U. gigas

Binomial name
- Urolophus gigas T. D. Scott, 1954

= Spotted stingaree =

Species of cartilaginous fish

The spotted stingaree (Urolophus gigas) is an uncommon species of stingray in the family Urolophidae, endemic to shallow waters along the coast of southern Australia. It favors rocky reefs and seagrass beds. This species can be readily identified by its nearly circular, dark-colored pectoral fin disc, adorned with a complex pattern of white or cream spots. Its eastern and western forms differ slightly in coloration and have been regarded as separate species. There is a skirt-shaped curtain of skin between its nostrils. Its tail is fairly thick and terminates in a short leaf-shaped caudal fin; a relatively large dorsal fin is present just in front of the stinging spine.

Rather reclusive, at least during the day, the spotted stingaree preys largely on crustaceans. It is aplacental viviparous: female bear litters of up to 13 pups and supply them with histotroph ("uterine milk") during gestation. Relatively inoffensive towards humans, the International Union for Conservation of Nature (IUCN) has listed this species under Least Concern, citing the overall low level of fishing activity across its range. Furthermore, it is sheltered from commercial fishing gear by the rough terrain of its favored habitats.

== Taxonomy ==
The first known specimen of the spotted stingaree was collected off Port Noarlunga in South Australia, and described by Trevor Scott in a 1954 issue of the scientific journal Records of the South Australian Museum. The specific epithet gigas is Greek for "giant". The eastern and western forms of this ray differ slightly in coloration; the western form, called Sinclair's stingaree, has been considered a distinct separate species by some authors.

== Distribution and habitat ==
Widely but patchily distributed along the southern coast of Australia, the spotted stingaree occurs from Albany, Western Australia to Lakes Entrance, Victoria, including Bass Strait and the northern Tasmanian coast. It does not appear to be common, not does it aggregate any particular location. Bottom-dwelling in nature, this species inhabits the continental shelf from the intertidal zone to a depth of 50 m (160 ft). It is most commonly found in and around seagrass beds and rocky reefs, and has also been recorded from estuaries.

== Description ==
The pectoral fin disc of the spotted stingaree is oval in shape and slightly longer than wide; it is more circular in juveniles. The snout is fleshy and usually smoothly rounded, without a protruding tip. The eyes are tiny and followed by much larger comma-shaped spiracles, which have rounded posterior rims. There is a skirt-shaped curtain of skin with a finely fringed posterior margin between the nostrils. The floor of the small mouth bears 9–12 papillae (nipple-like structures); a further narrow patch of papillae is found on the lower jaw. The teeth are small, with roughly oval bases. The five pairs of gill slits are short, and the pelvic fins are small and rounded.

The tail measures 76–80% as long as the disc and is fairly thick, with an oval cross-section and no lateral skin folds. A serrated stinging spine is placed atop the tail and preceded by a prominent dorsal fin; the caudal fin is lance-like, short, and deep. The skin is completely smooth. The disc is dark brown to black above, becoming lighter towards the margins, and sometimes with irregularly scattered dark dots. There are 2–3 rows of small whitish spots that border the disc margin and may extend onto the tail, as well as much larger pale spots arranged in groups over the middle of the back. The areas before and behind the eyes, and a pair of patches at the back of the disc, are usually free of spots. The tail has a light stripe along the midline in juveniles, and light spots in some adults; the dorsal and caudal fins are dark brown to black with whitish edges. The underside is white or nearly so; most individuals have dusky blotches and wide bands bordering the lateral disc margins. In some rays the color pattern is faint. This species can grow up to 80 cm (31 in) long.

== Biology and ecology ==
During the day, the spotted stingaree is often encountered buried in sand or hidden amongst seagrass or rocks. It feeds mainly on crustaceans. As in other stingrays, it is presumably aplacental viviparous with the developing embryos being nourished via maternal histotroph ("uterine milk"). Females can produce litters of up to 13 pups. Males and females reach sexual maturity at approximately 42 cm (17 in) and 46 cm (18 in) long respectively.

== Human interactions ==
Compared to some of its relatives like the sparsely-spotted stingaree (U. paucimaculatus), the spotted stingaree is less aggressive when disturbed by humans. There is little to no fishing activity across most of this species' range, and its preference for rocky habitats mostly protect it from bottom trawls. The Southern and Eastern Scalefish and Shark Fishery (SESSF) take it as bycatch, but not in significant numbers. It may potentially be affected by habitat degradation or recreational fishing. Given that it is little threatened by human activity, the International Union for Conservation of Nature (IUCN) has assessed the spotted stingaree as of Least Concern. The range of this species encompasses a number of small Marine Protected Areas (MPAs), and it would potentially benefit from the implementation of the 2004 Australian National Plan of Action for the Conservation and Management of Sharks.
