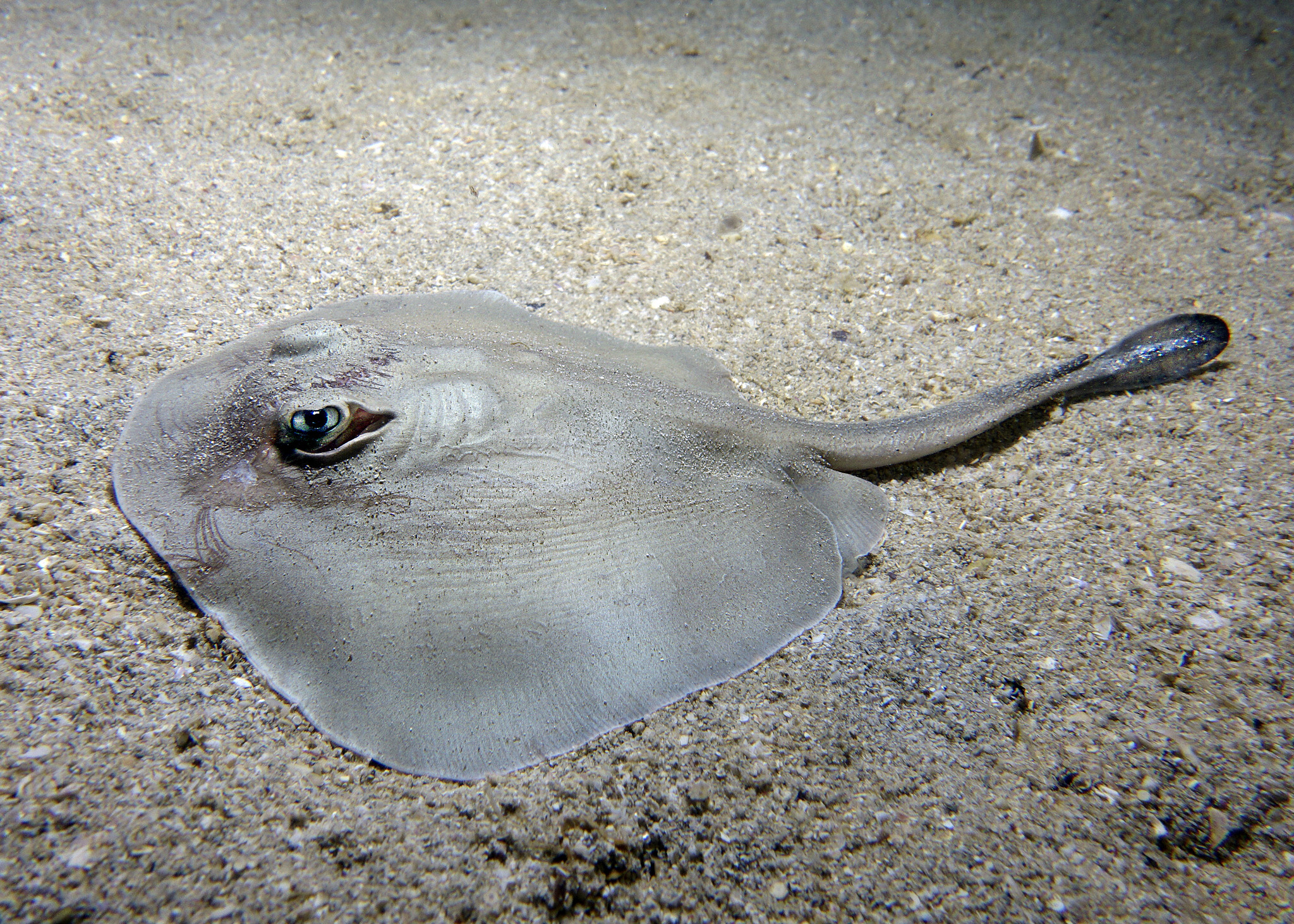
- Trygonoptera mucosa in Mangles Bay, Australia

Conservation status
- Least Concern (IUCN 3.1)

Scientific classification
- Kingdom: Animalia
- Phylum: Chordata
- Class: Chondrichthyes
- Subclass: Elasmobranchii
- Order: Myliobatiformes
- Family: Urolophidae
- Genus: Trygonoptera
- Species: T. mucosa

Binomial name
- Trygonoptera mucosa (Whitley, 1939)

Synonyms
- Urolophus mucosus Whitley, 1939

= Western shovelnose stingaree =

Species of cartilaginous fish

The western shovelnose stingaree (Trygonoptera mucosa) is a common species of stingray in the family Urolophidae, inhabiting shallow sandy flats and seagrass beds off southwestern Australia from Perth to Gulf St Vincent. Growing to 37 cm (15 in) long, this small ray has a rounded pectoral fin disc and a blunt, broadly triangular snout. Its nostrils have enlarged lobes along the outer rims and a skirt-shaped curtain of skin between them with a strongly fringed posterior margin. Its tail ends in a lance-like caudal fin and lacks dorsal fins and lateral skin folds. This species is colored grayish to brownish above, sometimes with lighter and darker spots, and pale below, sometimes with darker marginal bands and blotches.

Sedentary polychaete worms are by far the most important food source of the western shovelnose stingaree; other benthic invertebrates and the odd bony fish may also be taken. Reproduction is aplacental viviparous, with females bearing one or two pups annually in late May or early June. The gestation period lasts one year, during which the mother produces histotroph ("uterine milk") to nourish her developing embryos. The International Union for Conservation of Nature (IUCN) has assessed this species as of Least Concern, as it faces little to no fishing pressure other than in the northwestern extreme of its range, where it is frequently caught incidentally by trawls. It usually survives to be discarded, though its tendency to abort its young when captured is of concern.

== Taxonomy ==
Australian ichthyologist Gilbert Percy Whitley originally described the western shovelnose stingaree as Urolophus (Trygonoptera) mucosus in a 1939 volume of the scientific journal Australian Zoologist, based on a specimen collected from King George Sound off Albany, Western Australia. Subsequent authors have recognized Trygonoptera as having full generic status. This species is closely related to the recently described T. galba and T. imitata, with which it forms a species complex that may include additional undescribed species; one example is a form found off Perth that resembles T. mucosa but is much larger, reaching a length of 61 cm (24 in). Other common names for this ray include kejetuk, bebil, and western stingaree.

== Distribution and habitat ==
The western shovelnose stingaree is endemic to southwestern Australia, where it is one of the most common representatives of its family. Its range extends from the Gulf St Vincent near Glenelg westward to Perth, and possibly further north to Dongara. Bottom-dwelling in nature, the western shovelnose stingaree inhabits sandy and seagrass habitats at a depth of 1–40 m (3.3–131.2 ft), and particularly favors relatively deeper waters close inshore. Individuals of all ages and both sexes occupy the same habitats year-round.

== Description ==
The western shovelnose stingaree has a rounded pectoral fin disc slightly wider than long. The leading margins are nearly straight and converge at an obtuse angle on the fleshy snout, which has a blunt, non-protruding tip. The modestly sized eyes are followed by much larger, comma-shaped spiracles, whose "tails" curl down and forward to beneath the anterior third of the eyeball; the posterior margins of the spiracles are angular. The outer rims of the nostrils are expanded into large, flattened lobes. Between the nostrils is a skirt-shaped curtain of skin with a deeply fringed posterior margin that obscures the small mouth. The lower jaw bears a patch of papillae (nipple-shaped structures). There are 7–9 small papillae across the floor of the mouth. The teeth are small with roughly oval bases. The five pairs of gill slits are short.

The pelvic fins are small and rounded. The tail measures 71–91% of the disc length, has a flattened oval cross-section, and terminates in a low leaf-shaped caudal fin. The tail bears a serrated stinging spine on the dorsal surface about midway along its length; there are no dorsal fins or lateral fin folds. The skin is completely devoid of dermal denticles. The western shovelnose stingaree is grayish to ochre to dark brown in color above, becoming dusky to black on the caudal fin; some rays also exhibit an irregular scattering of lighter and darker spots. The underside is white to beige, occasionally with a wide, dark brown band and blotches along the margins of the disc and tail, which is most obvious in juveniles. This species has a maximum reported disc width of 28 cm (11 in) for males and 37 cm (15 in) for females.

== Biology and ecology ==
The proportionately larger spiracles of the western shovelnose stingaree suggest that it is adapted for environments with lower dissolved oxygen levels than its close relatives. This species feeds predominantly on polychaete worms, which comprise over 85% of its diet by volume; of the polychaetes consumed, most are of the sedentary type that are typically found in buried tubes. The enlarged lobes and numerous sensory papillae adjacent to its mouth likely aid in locating, reaching and extracting such deep-burrowed prey; the ray also has a mechanism for avoiding the ingestion of sediment, possibly by expelling it through the gill slits. Crustaceans, including shrimp, amphipods, isopods, mysids, and tanaids, and sipunculid worms constitute minor secondary food sources. Molluscs, echinoderms, and bony fishes are very rarely eaten. Rays of all ages have similar diets overall, though amphipods and tanaids are generally only taken by small rays, and sipunculids by large rays. A known parasite of this species is the nematode Echinocephalus overstreeti.

Like other stingrays, the western shovelnose stingaree is aplacental viviparous; adult females have a single functional uterus (on the left), and produce litters of usually one, but rarely two, pups every year. Ovulation and mating occurs in May or June. Newly fertilized eggs are enclosed by a thin brown membrane, and may undergo a short period of diapause (suspended development) before the onset of embryonic growth, as is the case in related species such as T. personata. The total gestation period lasts about a year; once the developing embryos exhaust their supply of yolk, they are supplied with nutrient-rich histotroph ("uterine milk") by the mother. Parturition takes place in late May or early June. Newly born rays measure around 11 cm (4.3 in) across. Females grow slower and to a larger ultimate size than males; sexual maturity is attained at roughly 22 cm (8.7 in) across and two years of age for males, and 25 cm (9.8 in) across and five years of age for females. The maximum lifespan is 12 years for males and 17 years for females.

== Human interactions ==
Because of its abundance, the western shovelnose stingaree is regularly caught incidentally by a small number of scallop and prawn trawlers operating off Perth and Mandurah in the northwestern portion of its range, and possibly also by the South Australian Prawn Fisheries operating at the eastern limit of its range. Lacking economic value, it is usually released alive when captured, though of concern is the fact that stingarees tend to abort their young when captured. Nevertheless, most of this species' range sees little to no fishing activity, and as a result the International Union for Conservation of Nature (IUCN) has listed it under Least Concern. This species would potentially benefit from the implementation of the 2004 Australian National Plan of Action for the Conservation and Management of Sharks.
