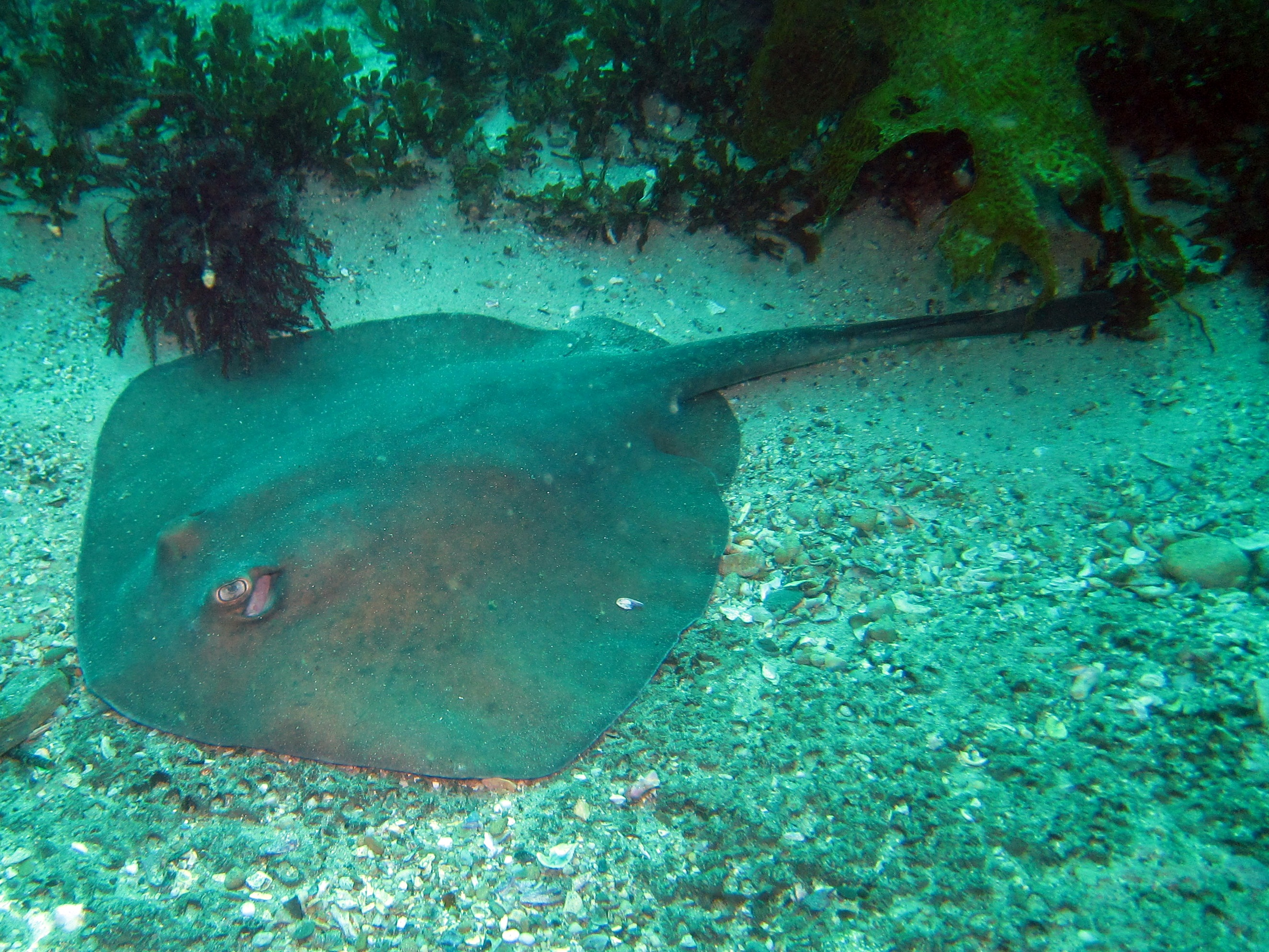

Conservation status
- Least Concern (IUCN 3.1)

Scientific classification
- Kingdom: Animalia
- Phylum: Chordata
- Class: Chondrichthyes
- Subclass: Elasmobranchii
- Order: Myliobatiformes
- Family: Urolophidae
- Genus: Trygonoptera
- Species: T. imitata

Binomial name
- Trygonoptera imitata Yearsley, Last & M. F. Gomon, 2008

= Eastern shovelnose stingaree =

Species of cartilaginous fish

The eastern shovelnose stingaree (Trygonoptera imitata) is a species of stingray in the family Urolophidae, endemic to coastal waters off southeastern Australia, excluding Tasmania. This species has a rounded pectoral fin disc wider than long, a fleshy snout forming an obtuse angle, and a relatively short tail terminating in a caudal fin. Its nostrils have prominent lobes on their outside rims and a skirt-shaped curtain of skin with a strongly fringed trailing margin between them. The dorsal coloration is mostly plain brownish, occasionally with a scattering of darker and/or lighter spots. One of the larger stingarees, it can grow to at least 80 cm (31 in) long.

Preying mainly on polychaete worms, the eastern shovelnose stingaree is rather common in very shallow, coastal bays over fine substrates, though it does range to a depth of 120 m (390 ft) or more. Reproduction is aplacental viviparous, with the females supplying their unborn young with histotroph ("uterine milk"). The gestation period for the embryos lasts 4–7 months, though this is preceded by a prolonged period during which the eggs are maintained under suspended development. Females produce litters of up to seven pups annually, from late February to April. This species is caught incidentally by inshore commercial fisheries using seine nets and bottom trawls, and may be additionally impacted by habitat degradation and invasive species. Its numbers are known to have declined in Port Phillip, and the International Union for Conservation of Nature (IUCN) has listed it as least concern.

== Taxonomy ==
Prior to being formally described in a 2008 Commonwealth Scientific and Industrial Research Organisation (CSIRO) publication, the eastern shovelnose stingaree was provisionally known as Trygonoptera "sp. B" and had often been misidentified as T. testacea or T. mucosa. Because of its close resemblance to those two species, Gordon Yearsley, Peter Last, and Martin Gomon gave it the specific epithet imitata. The type specimen is a 61 cm (24 in) long adult male caught in the Bass Strait, east of Wilsons Promontory, Victoria

== Distribution and habitat ==
The eastern shovelnose stingaree is found off southeastern Australia from Jervis Bay in New South Wales to Beachport and probably Gulf St Vincent in South Australia. It occurs in the northern Bass Strait and has been seen off Flinders Island, but is evidently absent from Tasmania itself. The center of distribution for this ray is off Victoria, and it is abundant in Port Phillip and Western Port. A bottom-dwelling species, the eastern shovelnose stingaree favors sheltered, inshore habitats with soft bottoms, in water less than 5 m (16 ft) deep. However, it is known from as deep as 120 m (390 ft), and there is a record of a specimen, apparently of this species, collected from the continental slope at a depth of 200–440 m (660–1,440 ft).

== Description ==
The pectoral fin disc of the eastern shovelnose stingaree is rounded in shape, wider than long, and thick at the center. The anterior margins of the disc are straight to gently convex, and converge at a blunt angle on the fleshy, non-protruding snout; the outer corners of the disc are broadly rounded. The medium-sized eyes are followed by larger comma-shaped spiracles with angular posterior rims and "tails" that curve down and forward to below the front third of the eyeball. The outer rim of each nostril is enlarged into a prominent, flattened lobe. Between the nostrils, there is a skirt-shaped curtain of skin with a deep midline furrow lined by papillae (nipple-like structures) and a deeply fringed posterior margin that overhangs the small mouth. The lower jaw conceals the upper and bears a dense patch of papillae. The floor of the mouth bears three papillae in the middle and one or two papillae near either corner. The teeth are blunt with oval bases, with those towards the interior and middle of the lower jaw becoming more triangular with serrated edges. They are arranged in a quincunx pattern, numbering around 22 upper and 24 lower rows. The five pairs of gill slits are S-shaped.

The pelvic fins are modestly sized and roughly triangular; males have robust, tapering claspers. The smoothly tapering tail has a flattened oval cross-section at the base and ends in a lance-like caudal fin; it measures around three-quarters as long as the disc. Usually two serrated stinging spines, with the upper generally larger than the lower, are present atop the tail about halfway along its length. The tail lacks dorsal fins and fin folds. The skin is completely smooth. The dorsal coloration ranges from yellowish to dark grayish brown, which is darkest toward the midline and lightest towards the fin margins; some larger individuals also gain a smattering of fine black and beige spots. The underside is light-colored with a dark fin margins and sometimes irregular dark blotches on the abdomen. The tail is entirely dark past the base. This species reaches a maximum known length of 80 cm (31 in), making it the largest member of the genus and among the larger members of the family.

== Biology and ecology ==
The eastern shovelnose stingaree feeds on small benthic organisms, primarily polychaete worms, and excavates pits in search of its prey. Females have a single functional ovary, on the right, and are aplacental viviparous like other stingray species. Once fertilized, the relatively large eggs are retained in the uterus without developing for 5–8 months, after which the embryos emerge and rapidly develop to term over a period of 4–7 months. The embryos are at first sustained by internal and external yolk sacs; once the yolk supply is exhausted they are provided with nutrient-rich histotroph ("uterine milk") by the mother. Females bear one litter per year between late February and April, and ovulate a new batch of ova immediately afterward; the litter size is up to seven and increases with female size. The newborns measure 20–25 cm (7.9–9.8 in) long; the newborn weight of 150 g (5.3 oz) represents only a tenfold increase from the weight of the egg, the smallest such increase known from a live-bearing ray. Males attain sexual maturity at about 46 cm (18 in) long and 4.5 years of age, and females at about 49 cm (19 in) long and 5 years of age. The maximum lifespan is at least 10 years for males and 12 years for females.

== Human interactions ==
Inoffensive to humans, the eastern shovelnose stingaree can be easily approached underwater. Its flesh is edible, albeit rather chewy unless properly prepared. This species is caught incidentally by coastal commercial fisheries in beach and Danish seines and bottom trawls, especially by the Southern and Eastern Scalefish and Shark Fishery (SESSF). As it is taken from shallow water it often survives to be discarded, though of concern is mechanical injury when heavier fishing gear is involved, as well as the propensity for stingarees to abort their young when captured. Further threats to this species may include habitat degradation and disturbance from coastal development and recreational activities, and invasive species. The eastern shovelnose stingaree population of Port Phillip is known to have declined over the past decade, which coupled with continuing fishing pressure has led the International Union for Conservation of Nature (IUCN) to list it as Near Threatened. Its range does encompass some refuge areas, such as the Bass Strait where little trawling occurs, and several Marine Protected Areas (MPAs) recently set aside off Victoria. It would also potentially benefit from the implementation of the 2004 Australian National Plan of Action for the Conservation and Management of Sharks.
