= Yellow shovelnose stingaree =

Conservation status
- Least Concern (IUCN 3.1)

Scientific classification
- Kingdom: Animalia
- Phylum: Chordata
- Class: Chondrichthyes
- Subclass: Elasmobranchii
- Order: Myliobatiformes
- Family: Urolophidae
- Genus: Trygonoptera
- Species: T. galba

Binomial name
- Trygonoptera galba Last & Yearsley, 2008

Species of cartilaginous fish

The yellow shovelnose stingaree (Trygonoptera galba) is a little-known species of stingray in the family Urolophidae, endemic to the outer continental shelf off Western Australia at a depth of 100–210 m (330–690 ft). Growing to 39 cm (15 in) long, this species has an oval pectoral fin disc with a rather elongated, triangular snout, and a short tail with a caudal fin but no dorsal fin. There are prominent lobes outside of its nostrils, and a skirt-shaped flap of skin with a deeply fringed trailing margin in between. Above, this ray is an almost completely uniform light to dark yellow color, which darkens on the caudal fin. The International Union for Conservation of Nature (IUCN) assesses the yellow shovelnose stingaree as least concern, as there is minimal fishing within its range.

== Taxonomy ==
The first specimens of the yellow shovelnose stingaree were collected by the Taiwanese ship FV Hai Kung during the winter of 1981, when it was conducting exploratory fishery surveys off Western Australia. The ray was provisionally identified as Trygonoptera "sp. A" before being formally described by Peter Last and Gordon Yearsley in a 2008 Commonwealth Scientific and Industrial Research Organisation (CSIRO) publication. The specific epithet is derived from the Latin galbus ("yellow"), in reference to its coloration. The type specimen is a 33 cm (13 in) long adult male caught off the Houtman Abrolhos. This species is closely related to the western shovelnose stingaree (T. mucosa).

== Distribution and habitat ==
The yellow shovelnose stingaree inhabits a relatively narrow zone of the outer continental shelf between 100–210 m (330–690 ft) deep, stretching off Western Australia from Shark Bay to at least the Houtman Abrolhos, and probably to Perth. A similar shovelnose stingaree found from Rottnest Island to the western Great Australian Bight may also be of this species. This fairly common, bottom-dwelling ray prefers sandy habitats.

== Description ==
The yellow shovelnose stingaree has an oval pectoral fin disc slightly wider than long, with the anterior margins weakly convex and converging at an obtuse angle on a fairly elongated, fleshy snout. The tip of the snout does not protrude past the disc. The eyes are medium-sized, well-spaced, and slightly elevated. The spiracles behind the eyes are comma-shaped, with the "tail" curving beneath to the level of the mid-eye; the posterior margins of the spiracles are angular. The outer rim of each nostril is enlarged into a prominent lobe. Between the nostrils is a skirt-shaped curtain of skin with a deeply fringed posterior margin that overhangs the small mouth. The lower jaw conceals the upper jaw and bears a prominent, corrugated patch of papillae (nipple-like structures). The small teeth have oval to diamond-shaped bases and are arranged in a quincunx pattern; the crowns range from pointed near the middle of the jaws to blunt at the sides. There are 19–20 upper and 22–23 lower tooth rows. The floor of the mouth bears eight or more papillae. The five pairs of gill slits are S-shaped.

The pelvic fins are roughly triangular; the males have short, thick claspers. The tail measures less than an eighth as long as the disc and is moderately flattened at the base, tapering smoothly to a lance-shaped caudal fin. There are no dorsal fins or fin folds. A single, serrated stinging spine is placed atop the tail, well behind the base. The skin is devoid of dermal denticles. The upper surface of the disc and tail are a deep, even yellow to yellowish brown in color, becoming darker on the caudal fin. The underside is white to yellowish, sometimes with darker fin margins and/or irregular dusky blotches on the belly. The largest recorded specimen is 39 cm (15 in) long.

== Biology and ecology ==
Virtually nothing is known of the natural history of the yellow shovelnose stingaree. It is presumably aplacental viviparous like other stingrays. Newborns probably measure around 16 cm (6.3 in) long; males reach sexual maturity at 33–36 cm (13–14 in) long.

== Human interactions ==
The International Union for Conservation of Nature (IUCN) currently lacks sufficient information to assess the conservation status of the yellow shovelnose stingaree. The species faces little fishing pressure, as the depth range it occupies lies largely between the operating depths of coastal prawn fisheries and the small-scale Western Deepwater Trawl Fishery. It would potentially benefit from the implementation of the 2004 Australian National Plan of Action for the Conservation and Management of Sharks.
