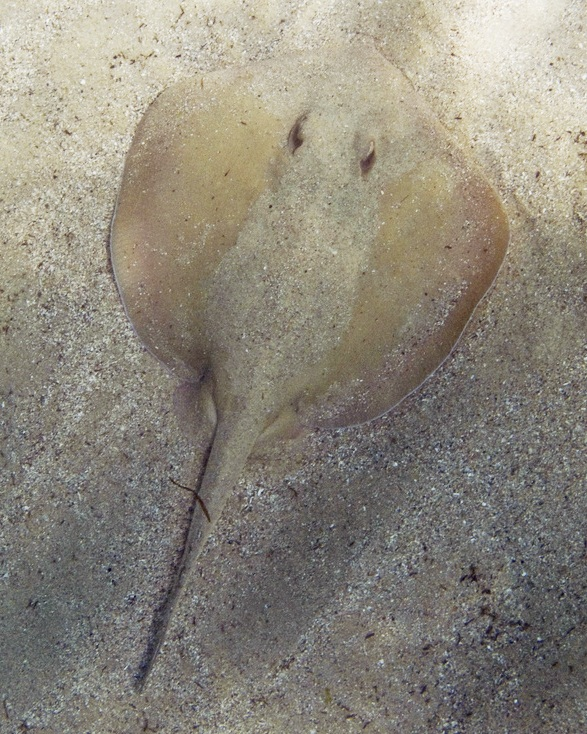

Conservation status
- Near Threatened (IUCN 3.1)

Scientific classification
- Kingdom: Animalia
- Phylum: Chordata
- Class: Chondrichthyes
- Subclass: Elasmobranchii
- Order: Myliobatiformes
- Family: Urolophidae
- Genus: Trygonoptera
- Species: T. testacea

Binomial name
- Trygonoptera testacea J. P. Müller & Henle, 1841

Synonyms
- Trygonoptera australis Steindachner, 1866; Trygonoptera henlei Steindachner, 1866; Trygonoptera muelleri Steindachner, 1866

= Common stingaree =

Species of cartilaginous fish

The common stingaree (Trygonoptera testacea) is a species of stingray in the family Urolophidae. The most abundant ray in inshore waters off eastern Australia, it generally inhabits estuaries, sandy flats, and rocky reefs from the shore to a depth of 60 m (200 ft). This plain brownish to grayish species has a rounded pectoral fin disc with a broadly triangular snout. Its nostrils have enlarged lobes on their outer margins and a skirt-shaped curtain of skin with a fringed posterior margin between them. Its tail bears a small dorsal fin before the stinging spine, and terminates in a leaf-shaped caudal fin. This ray can grow to 52 cm (20 in) long.

When young, the common stingaree preys almost entirely on shrimp; as it matures it comes to feed predominantly on polychaete worms. It is aplacental viviparous, with the developing embryos sustained by histotroph ("uterine milk") produced by the mother. Females usually bear two pups at a time. The common stingaree contributes substantially to the bycatch of commercial trawl and other fisheries within its range, and is also caught regularly by recreational fishers. It survives capture fairly well, but tends to abort any gestating young; it may also suffer persecution by fishery workers. Nevertheless, the common stingaree population does not appear to be in decline, and thus it has been listed as near threatened by the International Union for Conservation of Nature (IUCN).

== Taxonomy ==
The earliest known record of the common stingaree is a drawing made by English naturalist Joseph Banks during the first voyage of James Cook from 1768 to 1771, of a specimen from New Holland (Australia) that was never preserved. Based on the drawing, German biologists Johannes Müller and Jakob Henle described the species in their 1839–41 Systematische Beschreibung der Plagiostomen, creating for it the new genus Trygonoptera and giving it the specific epithet testacea, derived from the Latin word for "brick-colored". In Australia, this species may be referred to simply as "stingray" or "stingaree".

== Distribution and habitat ==
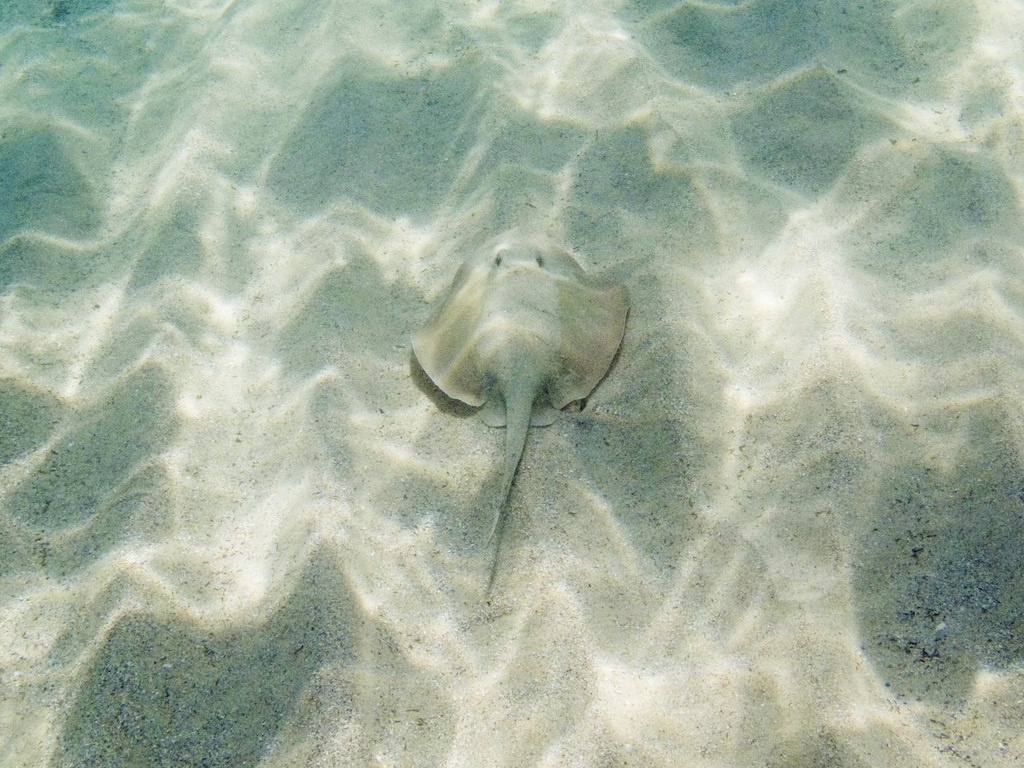
Shallow, sandy flats are a favored habitat of the common stingaree.

The distribution of the common stingaree is limited to the coastal waters off eastern Australia, extending from Caloundra in southern Queensland to Cape Howe in Victoria; the majority of its population is found north of Jervis Bay. It is the most abundant inshore ray within its range. The common stingaree is a bottom-dweller that favors sandy flats and rocky reefs, and also ventures well upstream into brackish estuaries. Most often it is found between the surf zone to a depth of 60 m (200 ft), though there are records from offshore, soft-bottomed areas as far down as 135 m (443 ft).

== Description ==
The common stingaree has a rounded pectoral fin disc slightly wider than long, with nearly straight anterior margins that converge at a broad angle on the fleshy snout. The tip of the snout may protrude slightly past the disc. The eyes are of medium size and immediately followed by comma-shaped spiracles with angular posterior margins. The outer rim of each nostril is enlarged into a broad, flattened lobe. A skirt-shaped curtain of skin is found between the nostrils, with a strongly fringed posterior margin that overhangs the small mouth. There is a patch of papillae (nipple-shaped structures) on the lower jaw, and 3–5 papillae across the floor of the mouth. The teeth are small with roughly oval bases. The five pairs of gill slits are short.

The pelvic fins are small with rounded margins. The tail measures 86–90% as long as the disc and has a flattened oval cross-section without lateral folds. One or two serrated, stinging spines are placed atop the tail about halfway along its length; just before the sting is a small dorsal fin, which may be reduced to a low ridge in a few individuals. The end of the tail bears an elongated, leaf-shaped caudal fin. The skin is entirely smooth. The common stingaree is an unmarked brownish or grayish above, lightening towards the edges of the fins, and darkening on the dorsal fin and the caudal fin trailing margin (the entire fin is black in juveniles). The underside is white, occasionally with wide dusky bands bordering the lateral margins of the disc. This species can grow to 52 cm (20 in), and possibly 61 cm (24 in) long; records of larger specimens likely represent misidentifications of the eastern shovelnose stingaree (T. imitata).

== Biology and ecology ==
The common stingaree occupies a similar ecological niche as the related eastern shovelnose stingaree, which has a more southerly distribution. Polychaete worms comprise over three-quarters of this ray's diet by volume; it favors errant polychaetes, which are relatively mobile and generally found buried shallowly in the sediment. A major secondary food source is crustaceans, particularly shrimp but also amphipods, penaeid prawns, crabs, isopods, and stomatopods. Small bony fishes, lancelets, and molluscs are infrequently consumed. Very young rays 10–15 cm (3.9–5.9 in) feed almost exclusively on shrimp; with age polychaetes become progressively more important until they come to dominate the diet.

Like other stingrays, the common stingaree is aplacental viviparous, with females sustaining their embryos via nutrient-rich histotroph ("uterine milk"). Typically two pups are born at a time, probably in early spring after a gestation period of approximately a year as in related species. Newborns measure around 12 cm (4.7 in) long; males and females attain sexual maturity at 35 cm (14 in) and 40 cm (16 in) long respectively. Known parasites of the common stingaree include a species of tapeworm in the genus Acanthobothrium, a species of fluke in the genus Monocotyloides, the monogenean Heterocotyle robusta, and the nematodes Paraleptus australis and Proleptus urolophi.

== Human interactions ==
Substantial fishery activities take place throughout the range of the common stingaree. Large numbers are caught incidentally by trawlers of the Eastern King Prawn (EKP) and the East Coast Trawl Fishery (ECTF) off Queensland, and the Ocean Prawn Trawl Fishery off New South Wales. To a lesser extent, it is also caught by estuary trawl and seine fisheries, beach seine fisheries and, at the southern extreme of its range, the Southern and Eastern Scalefish and Shark Fishery (SESSF). Commercially caught rays usually survive to be discarded. However, some fishers remove stingrays from nets using metal spikes to pierce their craniums ("spiking"); stingarees also have a tendency to abort their young when caught. Recreational surf anglers in Queensland and northern New South Wales regularly catch common stingarees, and often leave them on the beach to die.

Despite facing significant fishing pressure and having a low reproductive rate, the common stingaree remains abundant and there is no evidence of population decline. It appears to be less sensitive to habitat degradation than other stingrays, and is numerous in relatively developed areas such as in near Sydney. As a result, the International Union for Conservation of Nature (IUCN) has listed this species as near threatened. Its range encompasses a number of marine protected areas, and it would potentially benefit from the implementation of the 2004 Australian National Plan of Action for the Conservation and Management of Sharks.
