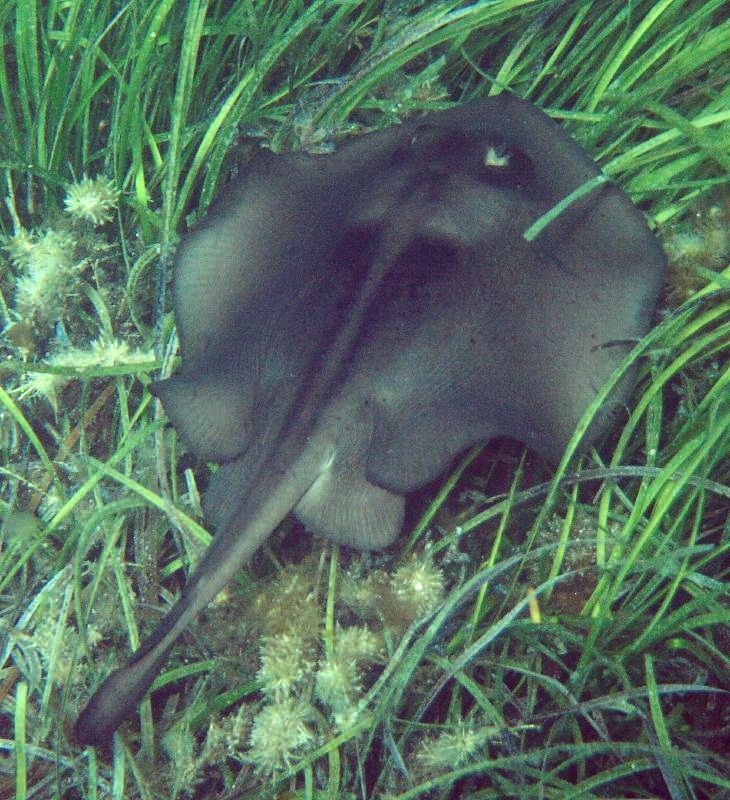

Conservation status
- Least Concern (IUCN 3.1)

Scientific classification
- Kingdom: Animalia
- Phylum: Chordata
- Class: Chondrichthyes
- Subclass: Elasmobranchii
- Order: Myliobatiformes
- Family: Urolophidae
- Genus: Trygonoptera
- Species: T. ovalis

Binomial name
- Trygonoptera ovalis Last & M. F. Gomon, 1987

= Striped stingaree =

Species of cartilaginous fish

The striped stingaree (Trygonoptera ovalis) is a common but little-known species of stingray in the family Urolophidae, endemic to shallow, inshore waters off southwestern Australia. Reaching 61 cm (24 in) long, this species is characterized by an oval, grayish to brownish disc with darker mask-like markings around the eyes and paired blotches at the center of the disc that are extended posteriorly into horizontal lines. Its nostrils have enlarged lobes on the outer margins and a skirt-shaped curtain of skin with a deeply fringed trailing margin in between. Its tail terminates in a relatively large leaf-shaped caudal fin, and bears a small dorsal fin just before the stinging spine. The rounded, flexible disc of the striped stingaree enable it to maneuver through the rocks, reefs, and seagrass that comprise its favored habitats. The International Union for Conservation of Nature (IUCN) has listed this species under Least Concern; it is seldom caught by fisheries due to its habitat preferences.

== Taxonomy ==
The striped stingaree was described by Peter Last and Martin Gomon in a 1987 issue of Memoirs of the National Museum of Victoria; its specific epithet ovalis means "oval" in Latin and refers to its shape. The type specimen, a female 21 cm (8.3 in) across, was trawled from the Great Australian Bight, south of Red Rocks Point, by the FRV Courageous on 3 March 1978. Other common names for this species include bight stingaree and oval stingaree.

== Distribution and habitat ==
The striped stingaree is found only along the coast of Western Australia, from Eucla to the Houtman Abrolhos, at a depth of 1–43 m (3.3–141.1 ft). This common, bottom-dwelling ray favors rocky areas and reefs, often in and around seagrass beds, and has also been observed over sand near beaches.

== Description ==
More so than any other member of its genus, the pectoral fin disc of the striped stingaree is oval in shape. The disc is slightly longer than wide, with the anterior margins converging at an obtuse angle on the rounded, non-protruding tip of the fleshy snout. The medium-sized eyes are immediately followed by comma-shaped spiracles with angular posterior rims. The outer rims of the nostrils are enlarged into prominent lobes. Between the nostrils is a skirt-shaped curtain of skin with long fringes on the posterior margin, that overhang the small mouth. There are numerous papillae (nipple-like structures) on the lower jaw, while four tiny papillae are found on the floor of the mouth. The small teeth have roughly oval bases. The five pairs of gill slits are short.

The pelvic fins are small and rounded. The tail measures 75–100% as long as the disc and is oval in cross-section; it is slightly flattened at the base and terminates in a fairly large, deep, leaf-shaped caudal fin. The upper surface of the tail mounts a serrated stinging spine, which is immediately preceded by a small dorsal fin; there are no lateral fin folds. The skin is entirely smooth. The dorsal coloration of this species is distinctive: on a grayish to grayish brown background, there is a dark mask-like pattern around the eyes that may extend to the tip of the snout (most obvious in juveniles), as well as a pair of dark blotches at the center of the disc that are drawn out posteriorly into stripes that run onto the tail; the area between the stripes is relatively light. The dark markings may be faint in some individuals. The underside is pale with dark margins on the fins, and the caudal fin is gray or black with a darker trailing margin. The maximum known length is 61 cm (24 in).

== Biology and ecology ==
The smoothly rounded, flexible margins of the striped stingaree's disc give it superior agility compared to most other rays, allowing it to dart unencumbered through structurally complex terrain and vegetation. It often seeks shelter beneath patches of seagrass, but has also been observed resting in the open or buried in sand. Little is known of its natural history. Reproduction is presumably aplacental viviparous like other stingrays; males attain sexual maturity at around 35 cm (14 in) long.

== Human interactions ==
The International Union for Conservation of Nature (IUCN) has assessed the striped stingaree as of Least Concern. A few are caught incidentally by the small numbers of scallop and prawn trawlers operating within its range, but this species is largely shielded from their activities by its preference for rough terrain. It would potentially benefit from the implementation of the 2004 Australian National Plan of Action for the Conservation and Management of Sharks.
