= New Ireland stingaree =

Conservation status
- Data Deficient (IUCN 3.1)

Scientific classification
- Kingdom: Animalia
- Phylum: Chordata
- Class: Chondrichthyes
- Subclass: Elasmobranchii
- Order: Myliobatiformes
- Family: Urolophidae
- Genus: Spinilophus; Yearsley & Last, 2016
- Species: S. armatus

Binomial name
- Spinilophus armatus (Valenciennes, 1841)

Synonyms
- Urolophus armatus Valenciennes, 1841

Species of stingray

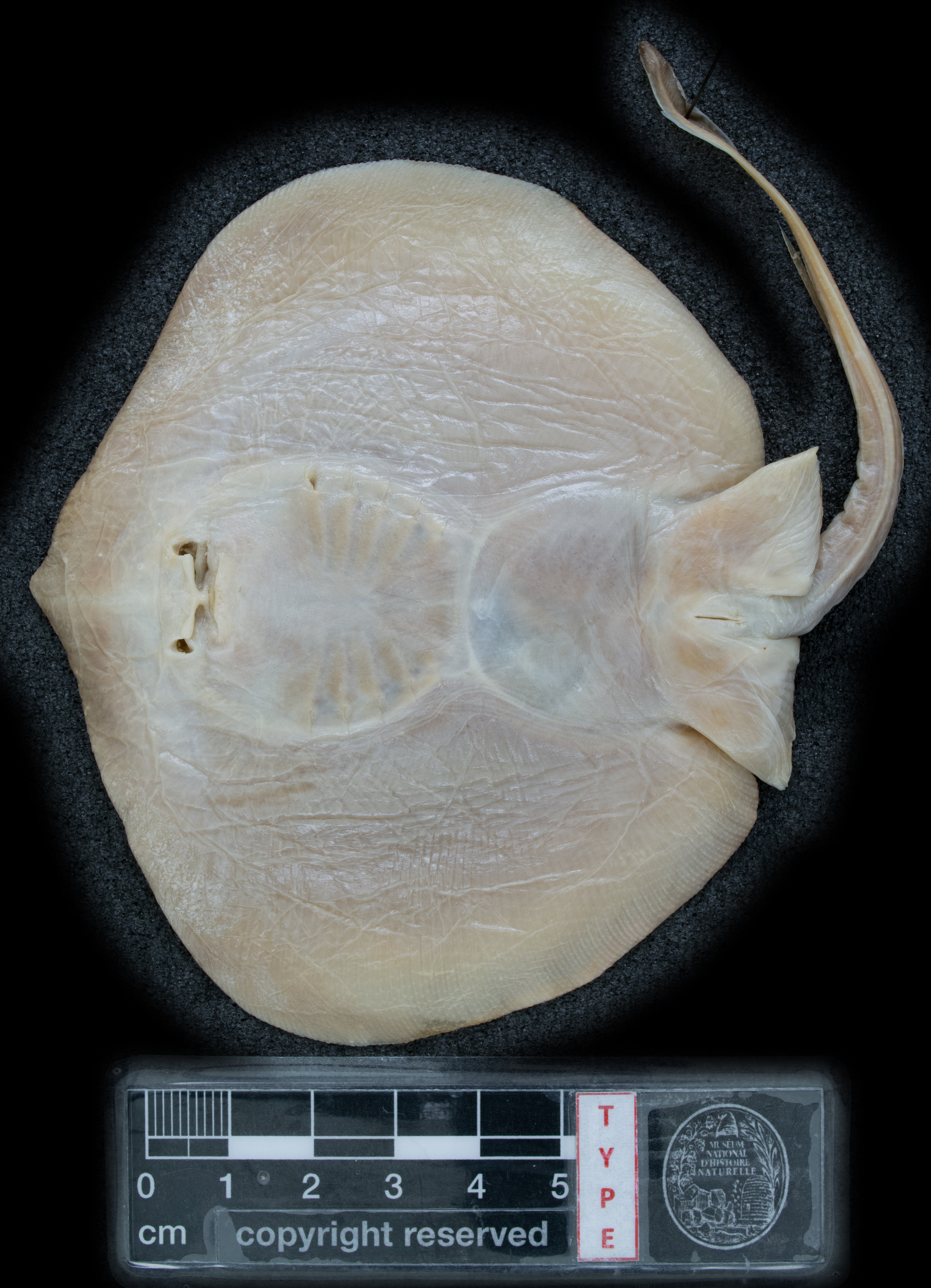
Appearance of the Spinilophus armatus

The New Ireland stingaree (Spinilophus armatus) or black-spotted stingaree, is a species of stingray in the family Urolophidae, known only from a single juvenile male 17.4 cm (6.9 in) long, collected in the Bismarck Archipelago. This species has an oval pectoral fin disc with tiny eyes and a rectangular curtain of skin between the nostrils. Its tail is fairly long and terminates in a leaf-shaped caudal fin, and lacks a dorsal fin. Uniquely among stingarees, it has rows of sharp spinules on the posterior portion of its back and the base of its tail. Its dorsal coloration is brown with dark spots. The International Union for Conservation of Nature (IUCN) has listed this ray as Data Deficient, pending more information.

== Taxonomy ==
The only known specimen of the New Ireland stingaree is a juvenile male collected by René Primevère Lesson and Prosper Garnot, during the 1822–25 expedition of the French frigate La Coquille. It was first referenced as Urolophus armatus by Achille Valenciennes, and furnished with a description by Johannes Müller and Jakob Henle (who are thus considered the species authorities) in their 1838–41 Systematische Beschreibung der Plagiostomen. Its specific epithet means "armed" in Latin, referring to its denticles.

== Distribution and habitat ==
The sole specimen was collected off the island of New Ireland in the Bismarck Archipelago, northeast of Papua New Guinea, though the depth and habitat was not recorded. No other specimens have been found since, suggesting that it occurs only in a very restricted geographic and depth range.

== Description ==
Superficially, the New Ireland stingaree resembles a much smaller deepwater stingray (Plesiobatis daviesi). Its pectoral fin disc is oval in shape and wider than long, with evenly rounded outer margins. The leading margins of the disc become slightly concave as they converge on the protruding, pointed snout. The eyes are tiny and immediately followed by slightly larger spiracles. The nostrils are short and oval, with a nearly rectangular curtain of skin between them; the posterior margin of the nasal curtain is minutely fringed. The small, bow-shaped mouth contains a single central papilla (nipple-like structure) on the floor; several tiny papillae are also scattered outside the lower jaw and on the tongue. There are 24 lower tooth rows. The pelvic fins are short and broad, with angular tips.

The slender tail measures 92% as long as the disc and tapers evenly to a long, low leaf-shaped caudal fin; there are subtle skin folds running along either side, but no dorsal fin. Two serrated stinging spines are placed atop the tail, about halfway along its length. This species is the only member of its family with dermal denticles. There are four rows of small, sharp, well-spaced thorns running along the middle of the back on the aft portion of the disc, along with a single similar row along the midline of the tail base, before the stings. Müller and Henle reported it to be brown above, with dark spots either scattered or merged into blotches, and white below with darker fin margins. The spots appear to have faded in the preserved specimen. The only, juvenile specimen is 17.4 cm (6.9 in) long.

== Biology and ecology ==
Virtually nothing is known of the natural history of the New Ireland stingaree. It is presumably aplacental viviparous with a small litter size, like other stingarees.

== Human interactions ==
There is minimal fishing within the New Ireland stingaree's range, though it may be negatively affected by oil and gold exploration. The International Union for Conservation of Nature (IUCN) presently lacks sufficient information to assess it beyond Data Deficient.
