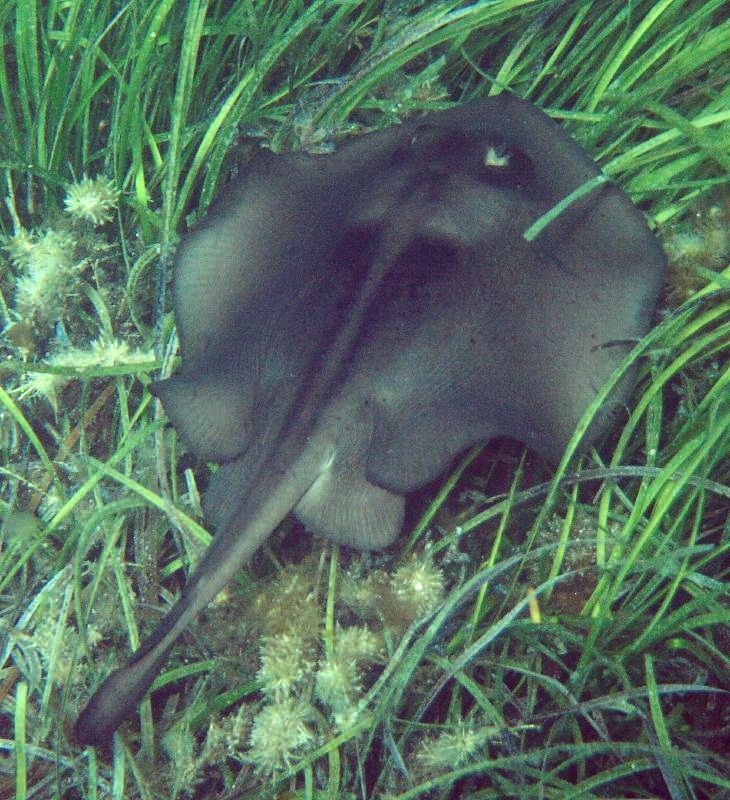
- Striped Stingaree (T. ovalis)

Scientific classification
- Kingdom: Animalia
- Phylum: Chordata
- Class: Chondrichthyes
- Subclass: Elasmobranchii
- Order: Myliobatiformes
- Family: Urolophidae
- Genus: Trygonoptera; J. P. Müller & Henle, 1841

Type species
- Trygonoptera testacea J. P. Müller & Henle, 1841

= Trygonoptera =

Genus of cartilaginous fishes

Trygonoptera is a genus of round rays endemic to the waters around Australia. Müller and Henle defined Trygonoptera in 1841. It has often been considered synonymous with Urolophus, but this has been refuted by recent studies. Trygonoptera can be distinguished from Urolophus in that the outer rims of its nostrils are enlarged into broad, flattened lobes; the two also differ in aspects of the skeleton.

== Species ==
There are currently six recognized species in this genus:

Image	Scientific name	Distribution
	Trygonoptera galba Last & Yearsley, 2008 (Yellow shovelnose stingaree)	Australia
	Trygonoptera imitata Yearsley, Last & M. F. Gomon, 2008 (Eastern shovelnose stingaree)	southeastern Australia, excluding Tasmania.
	Trygonoptera mucosa Whitley, 1939 (Western shovelnose stingaree)	southwestern Australia from Perth to Gulf St Vincent.
	Trygonoptera ovalis Last & M. F. Gomon, 1987 (Striped stingaree)	southwestern Australia.
	Trygonoptera personata Last & M. F. Gomon, 1987 (Masked stingaree)	southwestern Australia
	Trygonoptera testacea J. P. Müller & Henle, 1841 (Common stingaree)	eastern Australia,
