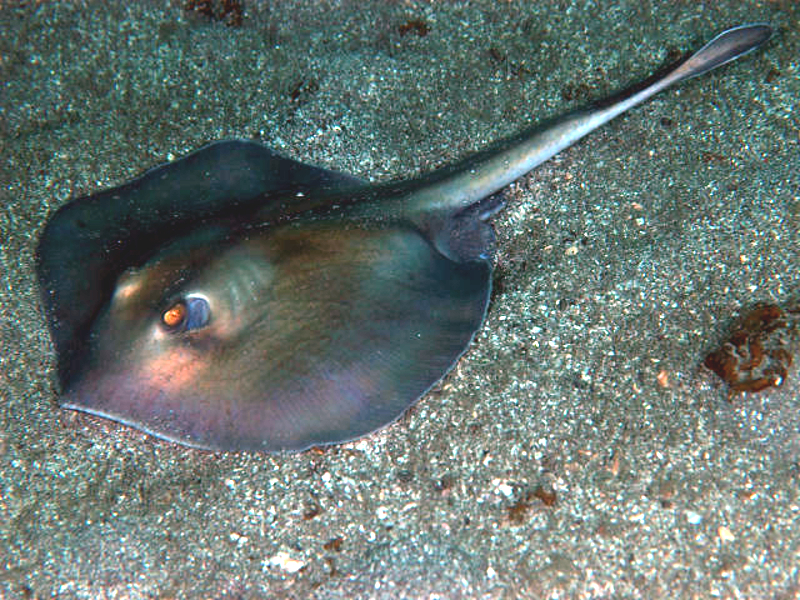

Conservation status
- Vulnerable (IUCN 3.1)

Scientific classification
- Kingdom: Animalia
- Phylum: Chordata
- Class: Chondrichthyes
- Subclass: Elasmobranchii
- Order: Myliobatiformes
- Family: Urolophidae
- Genus: Urolophus
- Species: U. aurantiacus

Binomial name
- Urolophus aurantiacus J. P. Müller & Henle, 1841

= Sepia stingray =

Species of fish

The sepia stingray (Urolophus aurantiacus) is a species of fish in the family Urolophidae. It is found in Japan, Taiwan, Vietnam, possibly North Korea, and possibly South Korea. It is threatened by habitat loss.
