= Lobed stingaree =

Conservation status
- Least Concern (IUCN 3.1)

Scientific classification
- Kingdom: Animalia
- Phylum: Chordata
- Class: Chondrichthyes
- Subclass: Elasmobranchii
- Order: Myliobatiformes
- Family: Urolophidae
- Genus: Urolophus
- Species: U. lobatus

Binomial name
- Urolophus lobatus McKay, 1966

Species of cartilaginous fish

The lobed stingaree (Urolophus lobatus) is a common species of stingray in the family Urolophidae, endemic to southern Western Australia in shallow, inshore sand and seagrass habitats. This species is plain sandy in colour above and has a broad, rounded pectoral fin disc. It is characterized by an enlarged, semicircular skin lobe of unknown function on the inner rim of each nostril. Its tail is slender, with lateral skin folds and a lance-like caudal fin but no dorsal fin. The maximum recorded width is 27 cm (11 in).

A benthic predator, the lobed stingaree feeds mostly on crustaceans, and to a much lesser extent on small bony fishes, polychaete worms, and molluscs. It is aplacental viviparous, with females typically bearing a single pup every October or November after a gestation period of ten months. Developing embryos are nourished by maternally produced histotroph ("uterine milk") after they exhaust their supply of yolk. In the northern portion of its range, the lobed stingaree is frequently caught incidentally by trawlers. Though it generally survives the experience, it has a tendency to abort its young when captured. However, this species is not greatly affected by human activity overall, and it has been listed under Least Concern by the International Union for Conservation of Nature (IUCN).

== Taxonomy ==
Australian ichthyologist Roland McKay described the lobed stingaree in a 1966 issue of the Journal of the Royal Society of Western Australia, giving it the specific epithet lobatus in reference to its unique nasal lobes. The type specimen was collected from a depth of 31–33 m (102–108 ft) northeast of Rottnest Island off Western Australia.

== Distribution and habitat ==
Among the most abundant representatives of its family within its range, the lobed stingaree is found along a short stretch of the southwest Australian coast from Esperance to Rottnest Island. This bottom-dwelling species favors sandy flats and seagrass beds, from the intertidal zone to a depth of 30 m (98 ft). In the southern portion of its range, it tends to be found relatively far from shore. Individuals of different ages and sexes are not segregated from each other.

== Description ==
The lobed stingaree has a rounded pectoral fin disc much wider than long, with nearly straight leading margins. The snout is fleshy and forms an obtuse angle; the tip may protrude slightly past the disc. The medium-sized eyes are followed by teardrop-shaped spiracles, which have a rounded posterior margin. The outer posterior corner of each nostril forms a visible lobe. Between the nostrils is a skirt-shaped curtain of skin with a fringed trailing margin; the front corners of the curtain are enlarged into distinctive, semicircular lobes. The mouth is small and contains 9–10 papillae (nipple-like structures) on the floor; a handful of papillae are also found on the lower jaw. The small teeth have roughly oval bases. The five pairs of gill slits are short. The pelvic fins are small and rounded.

The tail is slender and very flattened, measuring 87–100% as long as the disc and bearing a prominent horizontal skin fold on either side. There is a dorsally positioned, serrated stinging spine near the caudal fin, which is long, narrow, and leaf-shaped. There is no dorsal fin. The skin entirely lacks dermal denticles. This species is yellowish brown above, becoming slightly lighter at the lateral margins of the side, and white below; some individuals have irregular blotches and/or a dark stripe along the dorsal midline of the tail. The caudal fin becomes dark towards the tip. Males and females can grow up to 24 cm (9.4 in) and 27 cm (11 in) across respectively.

== Biology and ecology ==
Almost 90% of the food volume consumed by the lobed stingaree consists of crustaceans, in particular mysids, amphipods, shrimps, and cumaceans, which are captured on or just above the bottom. This species also feeds on polychaete worms, small bony fishes, and rarely molluscs. Rays smaller than 19 cm (7.5 in) across take relatively more mysids, amphipods, and cumaceans, while larger rays take more shrimps and fishes, and have a more diverse diet overall. Its dietary composition also shifts seasonally, mostly reflecting the greater availability of shrimp in summer and fall and cumaceans in winter and spring. A known parasite of this species is a tapeworm in the genus Acanthobothrium. The function of its unique nasal lobes is unknown.

Like other stingrays, the lobed stingaree is aplacental viviparous. Females have a single functional uterus, on the left, and an annual reproductive cycle. Mating occurs in November and October and ovulation from mid-November and mid-January, implying that the females store sperm internally for 1–3 months before fertilization. The gestation period lasts ten months; although up to six eggs may be fertilized, usually only a single pup (rarely two) develops to term. The embryo is initially nourished by an external yolk sac; by five months of age, the embryo measures 5.4 cm (2.1 in) across and has transferred most of the remaining yolk into its digestive tract. By six months of age, the mother begins to deliver nutrient-rich histotroph ("uterine milk") through thread-like extensions of the uterine epithelium called "trophonemata", which grow into the mouth, gills, and spiracles of the embryo. The disc and tail of the embryo are folded to hug the sting next to the body. Birthing occurs in late October or early November, with the newborns measuring around 11 cm (4.3 in) across. Females grow more slowly and to a larger ultimate size than males. Sexual maturity is reached by males at around 16 cm (6.3 in) across and two years of age, and by females at around 20 cm (7.9 in) across and three years of age. The maximum lifespan is 12 and 14 years for males and females respectively.

== Human interactions ==
The lobed stingaree is often caught incidentally by scallop and prawn trawlers operating off Perth and Mandurah in the northern part of its range. It usually survives to be released alive, though stingarees have a tendency to abort their young upon capture. As the number of vessels that catch this species is small, and it faces no other significant conservation threats within its range, the International Union for Conservation of Nature (IUCN) has assessed the lobed stingaree as of Least Concern. It would potentially benefit from the implementation of the 2004 Australian National Plan of Action for the Conservation and Management of Sharks.
