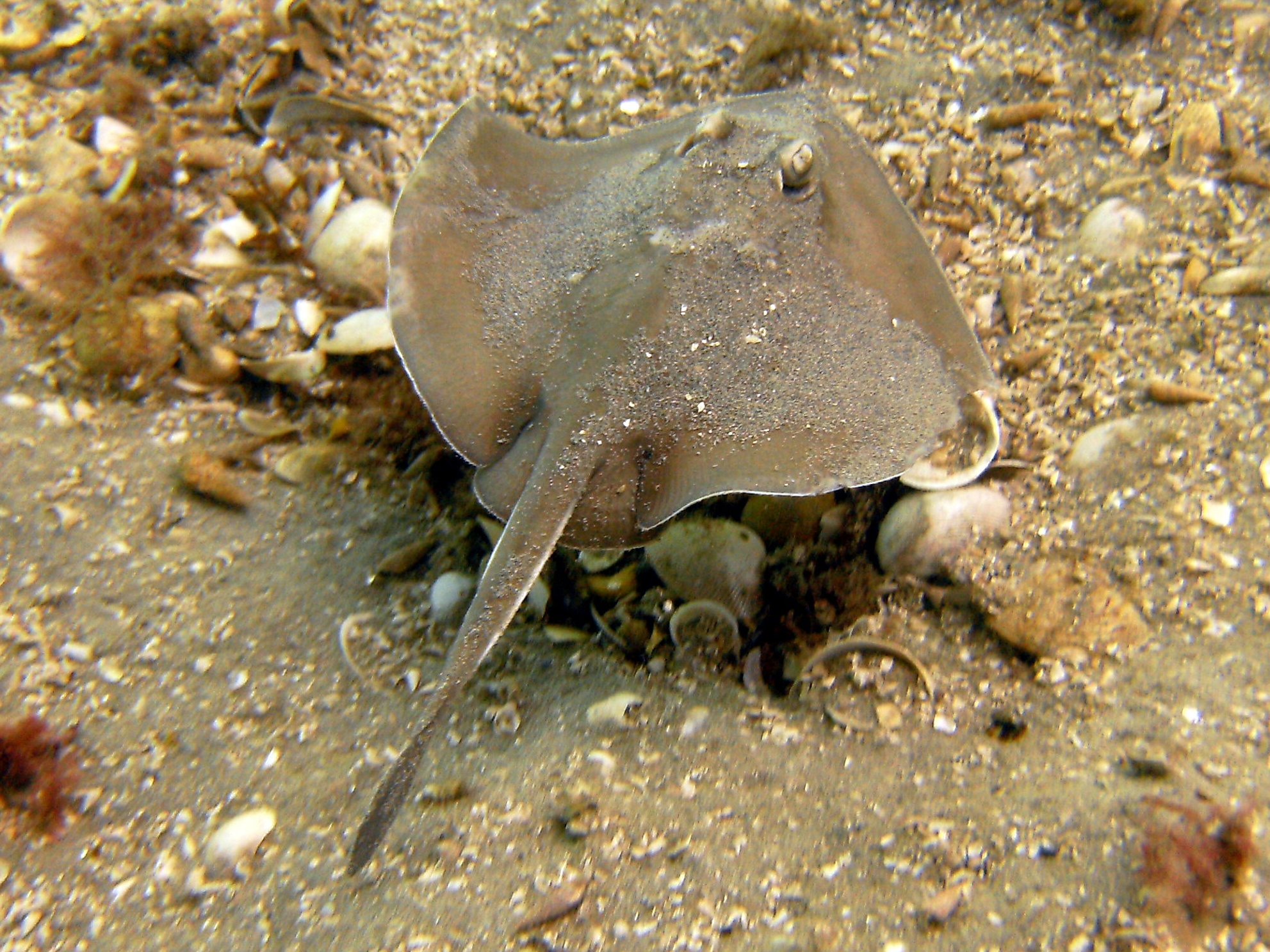

Conservation status
- Least Concern (IUCN 3.1)

Scientific classification
- Kingdom: Animalia
- Phylum: Chordata
- Class: Chondrichthyes
- Subclass: Elasmobranchii
- Order: Myliobatiformes
- Family: Urolophidae
- Genus: Urolophus
- Species: U. paucimaculatus

Binomial name
- Urolophus paucimaculatus J. M. Dixon, 1969
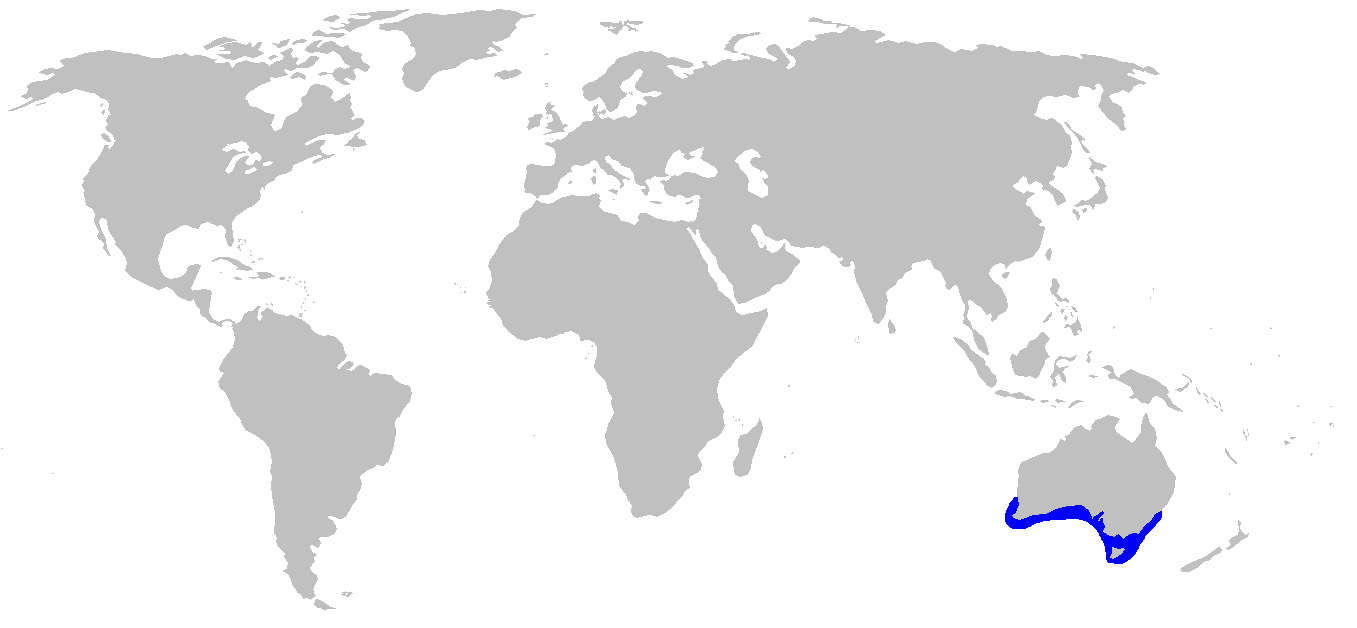
- Range of the sparsely spotted stingaree

= Sparsely spotted stingaree =

Species of cartilaginous fish

The sparsely spotted stingaree (Urolophus paucimaculatus), also known as the white-spotted stingaree or Dixon's stingaree, is a species of stingray in the family Urolophidae, common off the southern Australian coast. Preferring sandy flats and seagrass beds, this benthic ray can be found from close to shore to a depth of at least 150 m (490 ft), and tends to occur deeper in the northern portion of its range. Reaching a length of 57 cm (22 in), this species has a broad, diamond-shaped pectoral fin disc that is typically plain gray in color above with a V-shaped marking between the eyes. Individuals from southerly waters also generally exhibit a smattering of small, dark-edged white spots. This ray is further characterized by a distinctively bell-shaped curtain of skin between the nostrils. Its tail has a skin fold running along either side and a leaf-shaped caudal fin, but no dorsal fin.

Relatively inactive during daytime, the sparsely spotted stingaree preys mainly on crustaceans, and to a much lesser extent on polychaete worms and other small benthic organisms. It is aplacental viviparous, with the mother provisioning her young with histotroph ("uterine milk"). Life history differs between the eastern and western subpopulations: eastern females bear litters of up to six pups with a twelve-month gestation period, while western females bear litters of only one or two pups with a ten-month gestation period. Also, western rays mature later and live longer than eastern rays. The venomous sting of the sparsely spotted stingaree is potentially injurious to humans, and it has been reported to react aggressively if disturbed. The International Union for Conservation of Nature (IUCN) has listed it under Least Concern, as there is little fishing activity over the majority of its range.

== Taxonomy ==
The sparsely spotted stingaree was described in a 1969 issue of The Victorian Naturalist by Joan Dixon of the Museum Victoria. The specific epithet paucimaculatus is derived from the Latin paucus, meaning "few", and maculatus, meaning "spotted". The type specimen was collected from the Bass Strait, near Cape Patton in Victoria. Subpopulations from the eastern and western portions of its range differ in aspects of life history and merit further taxonomic investigation, according to the International Union for Conservation of Nature (IUCN).

== Distribution and habitat ==
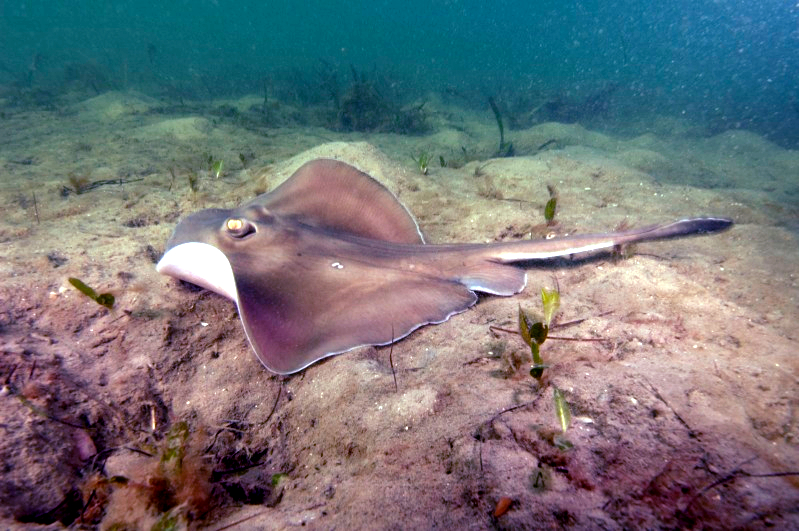
The sparsely spotted stingaree is common in areas covered by sand or seagrass.

One of the most abundant cartilaginous fishes off southern Australia, the sparsely spotted stingaree has a relatively wide distribution extending from Crowdy Head in New South Wales to Lancelin in Western Australia, including the entirety of Tasmania. Its range has expanded southward in the past few decades, apparently due to climate change. In Port Phillip, its numbers increased from 1970 to 1991, likely as a result of fisheries depleting its ecological competitors.

Bottom-dwelling in nature, the sparsely spotted stingaree inhabits a variety of sandy or seagrass-bottomed habitats, ranging from very shallow, sheltered bays and inlets to the open continental shelf, 150 m (490 ft) deep or more. Rays found further north, such as in the Great Australian Bight, tend to be found at depths greater than 80–100 m (260–330 ft). By contrast, rays found further south, off Victoria and Tasmania, are most common in less than 30 m (100 ft) of water. There is no evidence for segregation by age or sex, though there may be an offshore migration during winter.

== Description ==
The sparsely spotted stingray has a more or less diamond-shaped pectoral fin disc wider than long, with rounded outer corners. The anterior margins of the disc are nearly straight and converge at an obtuse angle on the fleshy snout, the tip of which barely protrudes from the disc. The small eyes are immediately followed by comma-shaped spiracles with angular or rounded posterior rims. The outer rim of each nostril is enlarged into a knob towards the back. Between the nostrils is a bell-shaped curtain of skin with a finely fringed trailing margin; only the Kapala stingaree (U. kapalensis) has a similarly shaped nasal curtain. The small mouth contains five or six papillae (nipple-like structures) on the floor, most of which have forked tips. Additional small papillae are present on the outside of the lower jaw. The teeth in both jaws are small with roughly oval bases, and are arranged in a quincunx pattern. The five pairs of gill slits are short. The pelvic fins are small and rounded.

The tail measures 77–98% as long as the disc; it is very flattened at the base and slender towards the tip, which bears a deep, leaf-shaped caudal fin. There is a prominent fold of skin running along either side of the tail, and a serrated stinging spine placed on the upper surface about halfway along its length. There is no dorsal fin. The skin is completely devoid of dermal denticles. This species is uniformly light gray above with a darker V-shaped marking between the eyes, and white below with slightly darker lateral disc margins. Most rays from the southern portion of its range also have a handful of small, regularly arranged spots atop the disc, each white with a dark border. Juveniles have a black caudal fin, which lightens with age (except sometimes for the margin). The largest individual on record was 57 cm (22 in) long.

== Biology and ecology ==
During the day, the sparsely spotted stingaree spends much time resting motionless on the bottom, often buried in sand. Crustaceans form the main component of its diet, accounting for over 80% of food intake by volume with amphipods, mysids, and shrimps being most important. Polychaete worms, mostly of the relatively mobile, shallowly buried "errant" type, are a major secondary food source. On rare occasions, molluscs, echinoderms, and small bony fishes are also eaten. This species incorporates a progressively greater diversity of prey into its diet as it grows older; specifically, mysids, isopods, and amphipods decline in importance, while shrimps, polychaete worms, penaeid prawns, and crabs are consumed in greater proportions. The sparsely spotted stingaree is preyed upon by the broadnose sevengill shark (Notorynchus cepedianus). It is known to be parasitized by a tapeworm in the genus Acanthobothrium, and the monogeneans Calicotyle urolophi and Merizocotyle urolophi.

Like other stingrays, the sparsely spotted stingaree is aplacental viviparous: once the developing embryos exhaust their supply of yolk, the mother supplies them with nutrient-rich histotroph ("uterine milk") via specialized extensions of the uterine epithelium called "trophonemata". Females have a single functional ovary and uterus, on the right side, and an annual reproductive cycle. In the eastern subpopulation, ovulation occurs in spring or early summer and the litter size ranges from one to six, increasing with female size. The gestation period lasts approximately one year, and the newborns measure about 15–16 cm (5.9–6.3 in) long. Males reach sexual maturity at around 28 cm (11 in) long and two and a half years of age, and females at around 27 cm (11 in) long and three years of age. The maximum lifespan is at least 8 years for males and 9 years for females. In the western subpopulation, mating occurs in early or mid-summer and females only bear litters of one or two pups. The gestation period lasts ten months, with birthing taking place in late spring or early summer. The newborns measure 13 cm (5.1 in) across. Males mature sexually at around 21 cm (8.3 in) across and three years of age, and females at around 22 cm (8.7 in) across and five years of age. The maximum lifespan is 14 years. In both subpopulations, females grow more slowly and to a larger ultimate size than males.

== Human interactions ==
Reported to be more aggressive than other stingarees, the sparsely spotted stingaree readily employs its venomous sting if disturbed and can inflict a painful injury on a human. It is edible, but seldom brought to market. Fishing pressure is insignificant across large portions of this ray's range, including in the Great Australian Bight, though substantial numbers are caught incidentally by commercial fisheries off southeastern and southwestern Australia in beach seines and bottom trawls. The sparsely spotted stingaree generally survives being captured, sorted, and discarded, though the process often causes it to abort any unborn young. Nevertheless, losses to fisheries appear to be sustainable at present, and thus the IUCN has listed this species under Least Concern. There are a number of small Marine Protected Areas (MPAs) within its range, and it would potentially benefit from the implementation of the 2004 Australian National Plan of Action for the Conservation and Management of Sharks.
