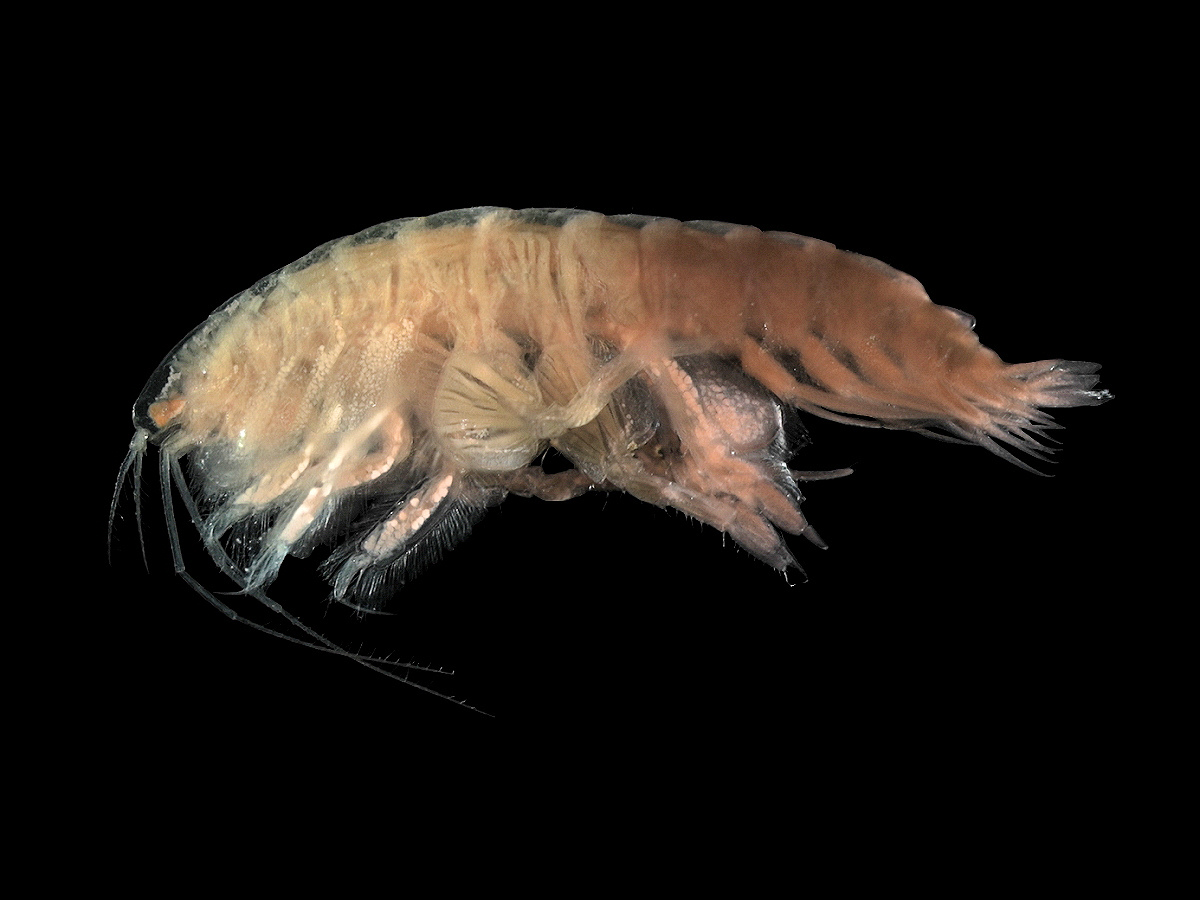
- Ampelisca brevicornis

Scientific classification
- Kingdom: Animalia
- Phylum: Arthropoda
- Clade: Pancrustacea
- Class: Malacostraca
- Order: Amphipoda
- Parvorder: Synopiidira
- Superfamily: Synopioidea; Bousfield, 1979
- Family: Ampeliscidae; Costa, 1857

= Ampeliscidae =

Family of crustaceans

The Ampeliscidae are a family of amphipods, distinct enough to warrant placement in a monotypic superfamily Ampeliscoidea. They are benthic, found at the bottom of seas and oceans. They are distributed worldwide, and are often abundant in areas with fine sediments. They live in infaunal tubes, constructed from "amphipod silk" and sediment.

== Genera ==
- Ampelisca
- Byblis
- Byblisoides
- Haploops
