= Masked stingaree =

Conservation status
- Least Concern (IUCN 3.1)

Scientific classification
- Kingdom: Animalia
- Phylum: Chordata
- Class: Chondrichthyes
- Subclass: Elasmobranchii
- Order: Myliobatiformes
- Family: Urolophidae
- Genus: Trygonoptera
- Species: T. personata

Binomial name
- Trygonoptera personata Last & M. F. Gomon, 1987

Species of cartilaginous fish

The masked stingaree (Trygonoptera personata) is a common species of stingray in the family Urolophidae, endemic to southwestern Australia. It prefers moderately deep areas of sand or seagrass some distance from shore, though it can be found in very shallow water or to a depth of 115 m (377 ft). The masked stingaree can be identified by the two large, dark blotches on the upper surface of its rounded pectoral fin disc, one of which encompasses its eyes like a mask. The outer rims of its nostrils are expanded into prominent lobes, while between the nostrils is a skirt-like curtain of skin with a deeply fringed trailing margin. Its tail bears a small dorsal fin just before the stinging spine, and end in a leaf-like caudal fin. This species grows up to 31 cm (12 in) across.

The diet of the masked stingaree consists primarily of polychaete worms and crustaceans, with a general shift from the latter to the former as the ray ages. It is aplacental viviparous, with females typically bearing one pup annually and nourishing it with histotroph ("uterine milk"). The 10–12-month long gestation period consists of a five-month period of suspended development for the egg, followed by rapid growth of the embryo and birthing in late April or early May. The International Union for Conservation of Nature (IUCN) has listed the masked stingaree under Least Concern. Fishing pressure on this species is largely limited to a small number of scallop and prawn trawlers. Most such incidental captures result in the ray being released alive, though it does have a tendency to abort any unborn young during capture.

== Taxonomy ==
Peter Last and Martin Gomon described the masked stingaree in a 1987 issue of Memoirs of the National Museum of Victoria, giving it the specific epithet personata (from the Latin personatus, meaning "masked") in reference to its distinctive coloration. A male 23 cm (9.1 in) across was designated as the type specimen; it was collected by the research trawler FRV Hai Kung from northeast of Cape Naturaliste in Western Australia on 23 April 1981.

== Distribution and habitat ==
Found off Western Australia from Shark Bay to Geographe Bay, the masked stingaree is one of the most abundant representatives of its family within its range, particularly in the south. This bottom-dwelling ray has been reported from the shore to a depth of 115 m (377 ft) on the continental shelf, and seems to be most common in offshore waters 20–35 m (66–115 ft) deep. It favors sandy flats and seagrass beds. There is no evidence of segregation by age or sex, or of seasonal migrations.

== Description ==
The pectoral fin disc of the masked stingaree is approximately as long as wide, and has a rounded shape. The anterior margins of the disc are nearly straight and converge at an obtuse angle on the fleshy, non-protruding snout. The eyes are modestly sized and immediately followed by comma-shaped spiracles with angular posterior rims. The outer margin of each nostril is enlarged into a broad, flattened lobe. Between the nostrils is a skirt-shaped curtain of skin with a fringed trailing margin, that conceals the small mouth. The lower jaw bears a patch of subtle papillae (nipple-shaped structures); there are also 3–4 papillae on the floor of the month. The small teeth have roughly oval bases. The five pairs of gill slits are short.

The pelvic fins are small with rounded margins. The tail measures 67–86% as long as the disc; it has an oval cross-section and is slightly flattened at the base. There is a single serrated stinging spine on the upper surface of the tail, which is immediately preceded by a rather large dorsal fin. The tail ends in an elongated, leaf-shaped caudal fin, and lacks lateral fin folds. The skin is devoid of dermal denticles. The masked stingaree has an ochre to gray dorsal coloration with two large, distinctive dark blotches, one forming a "mask" around the eyes and the other at the center of the disc; these blotches may be connected by thin lines along the midline and on either side. The underside is white, becoming darker at the fin margins. The dorsal and caudal fins are black in young rays, and fade to gray in adults. Males and females grow up to 27 cm (11 in) and 31 cm (12 in) across respectively.

== Biology and ecology ==
Polychaete worms and crustaceans are the predominant sources of food for the masked stingaree; on occasion sipunculid worms, molluscs, and echinoderms are also taken. This species preys on both sedentary polychaetes, which generally inhabit deeply buried tubes, and on errant polychaetes, which are generally more mobile and shallowly buried. The expanded lobes and sensory papillae adjacent to its mouth likely aid in locating and excavating such burrowing prey. Young rays feed mainly on crustaceans, including mysids, amphipods, cumaceans, tanaids, and shrimp. With age polychaetes are added to the diet; sedentary polychaetes are significant to rays 13–29 cm (5.1–11.4 in) across, while errant polychaetes become progressively more important such as that the largest rays eat little else.

Like other stingrays, the masked stingaree is aplacental viviparous. Females have a single functional uterus (the left) and produce a single pup (rarely two) per year. Ovulation and mating occur from mid-June to mid-July; fertilized eggs are enclosed by a delicate brown capsule and maintained in a state of diapause (dormancy) within the uterus until November. Afterward the embryos develop rapidly and are sustained by nutrient-rich histotroph ("uterine milk") produced by the mother; an average embryo increases in disc width from 1.1 cm (0.43 in) in December to 11 cm (4.3 in) in April, to be born in late April or early May at a disc width of 13 cm (5.1 in). The total gestation period, including diapause, lasts 10–12 months. Females grow more slowly and to a larger ultimate size than males. Males mature sexually at around 22 cm (8.7 in) across and females at 23 cm (9.1 in) across; both sexes mature on average at four years of age. The maximum lifespan is 10 years for males and 16 years for females.

== Human interactions ==
The scallop and prawn trawl fisheries operating off Perth and Mandurah regularly take the masked stingaree as bycatch, though only a small number of vessels are involved. This ray may also be caught incidentally by small-scale fisheries further north, though overall it does not face substantial fishing pressure. When caught, the masked stingaree usually survives to be discarded, though the tendency of captured stingarees to abort their young merits concern. Given the limited conservation threats faced by this common species, the International Union for Conservation of Nature (IUCN) has listed it under Least Concern. This species would potentially benefit from the implementation of the 2004 Australian National Plan of Action for the Conservation and Management of Sharks.
