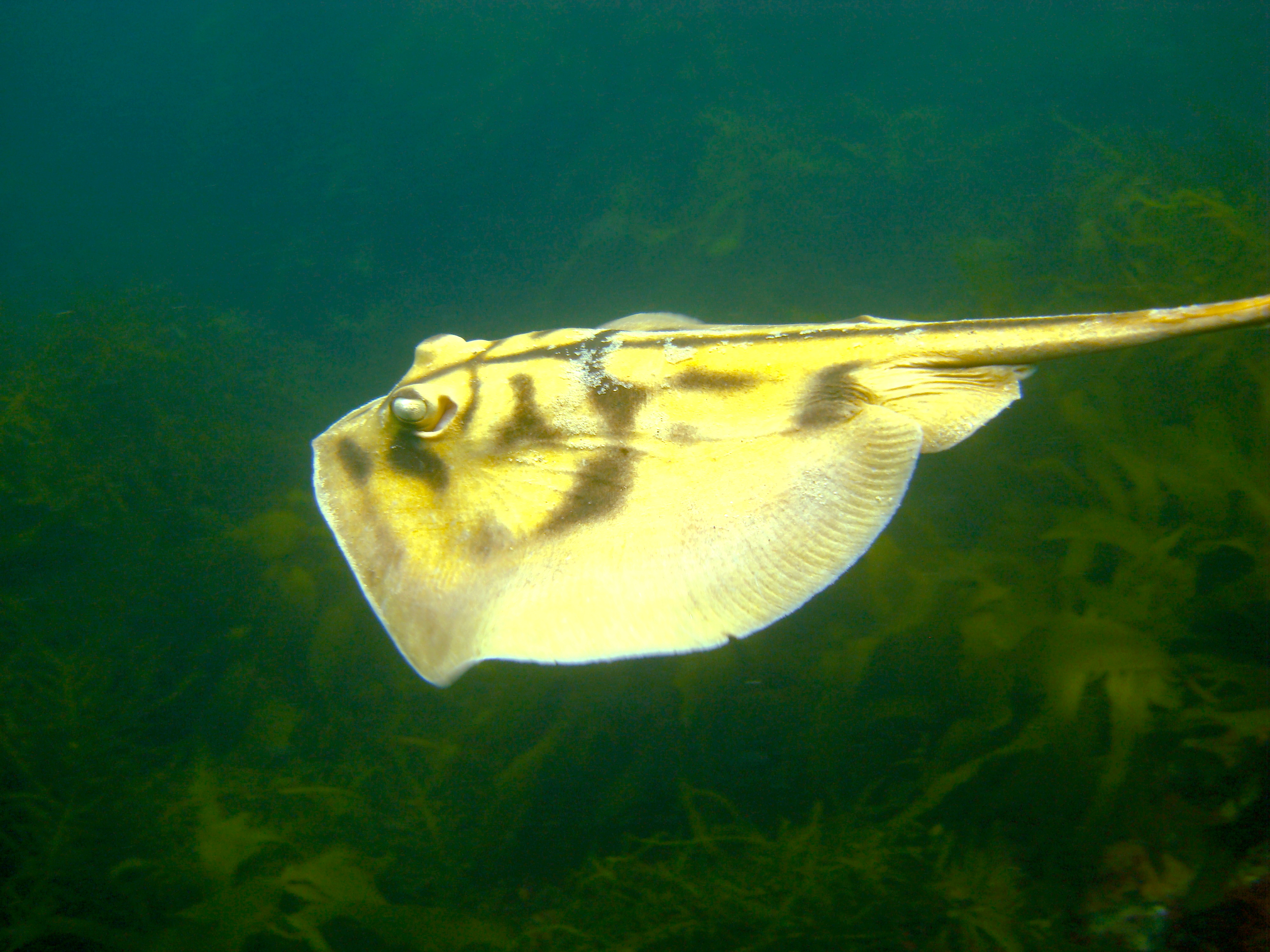
- Crossback stingaree (Urolophus cruciatus)

Scientific classification
- Kingdom: Animalia
- Phylum: Chordata
- Class: Chondrichthyes
- Subclass: Elasmobranchii
- Division: Batomorphi
- Order: Myliobatiformes
- Family: Urolophidae; J. P. Müller & Henle, 1841

Genera
- Spinilophus; Trygonoptera; Urolophus

= Urolophidae =

Family of cartilaginous fishes

The Urolophidae are a family of rays in the order Myliobatiformes, commonly known as stingarees or round stingrays. This family formerly included the genera Urobatis and Urotrygon of the Americas, which are presently recognized as forming their own family Urotrygonidae. Stingarees are found in the Indo-Pacific region, with the greatest diversity off Australia. They are sluggish, bottom-dwelling fish that have been recorded from shallow waters close to shore to deep waters over the upper continental slope. Measuring between 15 and 80 cm (5.9 and 31.5 in) long, these rays have oval to diamond-shaped pectoral fin discs and relatively short tails that terminate in leaf-shaped caudal fins, and may also have small dorsal fins and lateral skin folds. Most are smooth-skinned, and some have ornate dorsal color patterns.

Stingarees feed on or near the sea floor, consuming small invertebrates and occasionally bony fishes. They are aplacental viviparous, meaning their embryos emerge from eggs inside the uterus, and are sustained to term first by yolk and later by maternally produced histotroph ("uterine milk"). As far is known, the gestation period lasts around a year and litter sizes tend to be small. Stingarees have one or two relatively large, venomous stinging spines on their tail for defense, with which they can inflict a painful wound on humans. Generally, stingarees have no economic value. Some species form a substantial component of the bycatch of commercial trawl fisheries.

== Taxonomy and phylogeny ==
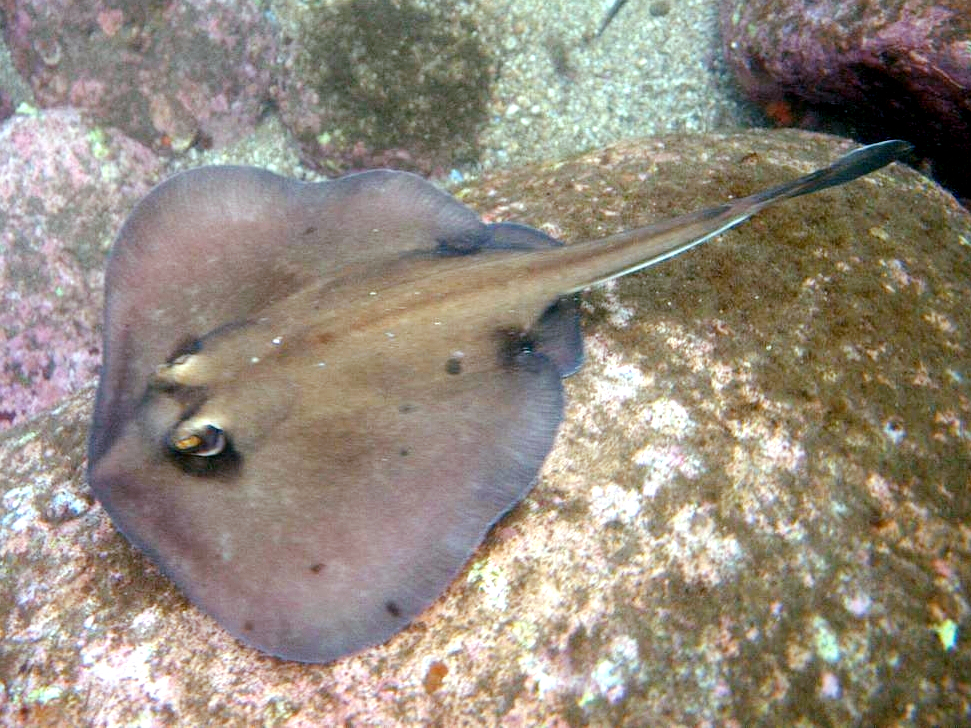
The Kapala stingaree (U. kapalensis), one of several newly described urolophids

The German biologists Johannes Müller and Jakob Henle created the genus Urolophus in 1837; in their subsequent 1838–41 Systematische Beschreibung der Plagiostomen, the pair created the genus Trygonoptera and also made the first reference to the urolophids as a group. The family has traditionally also included the genera Urobatis and Urotrygon of the Americas; John McEachran, Katherine Dunn, and Tsutomu Miyake moved them to their own family, Urotrygonidae, in 1996.

Recent phylogenetic analyses have confirmed the urolophids and related taxa belong to the order Myliobatiformes; they were once placed in the order Rajiformes with the guitarfishes and skates. Based on morphological characters, John McEachran and Neil Aschliman determined in a 2004 study that the urolophids formed a clade with the giant stingaree (Plesiobatis daviesi), and that the two were basal to a clade containing all other myliobatiform families except Platyrhinidae, Hexatrygonidae, and Zanobatidae. They proposed including Plesiobatis in the family Urolophidae, and classifying the family within the superfamily Urolophoidea within Myliobatiformes.

== Distribution and habitat ==
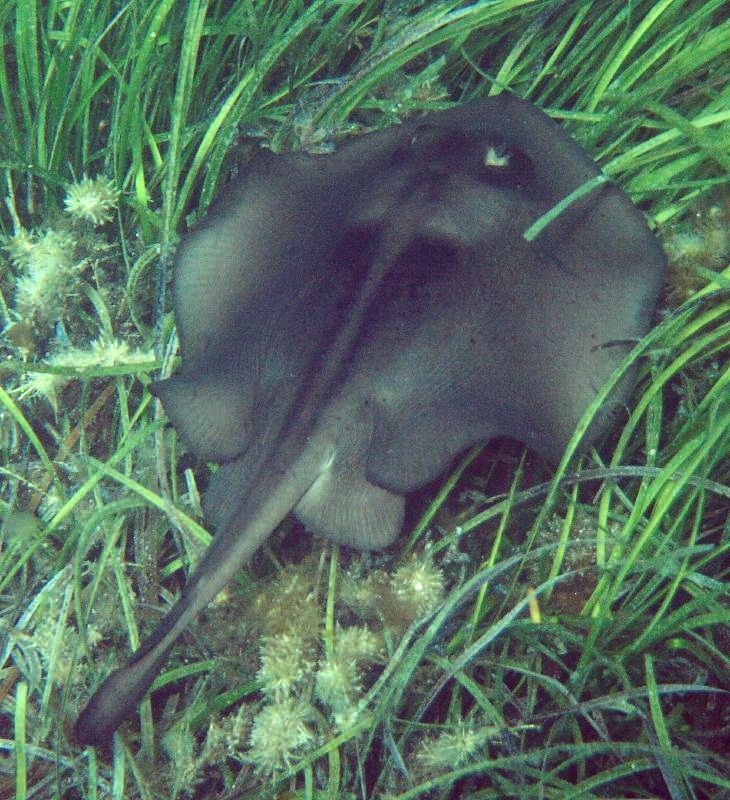
The striped stingaree (T. ovalis) prefers rocky or seagrass habitats.

The center of biodiversity for stingarees is Australia, where all 6 Trygonoptera and 15 of the 22 Urolophus species are endemic. A number of species are also found in the Coral Sea, a few in the Malay Archipelago, and one (the sepia stingray, U. aurantiacus) in the northwestern Pacific. Stingarees are bottom-dwelling rays that can be found from very shallow, inshore habitats such as estuaries and bays, to a depth of 420 m (1,380 ft) well offshore on the upper continental shelf. Some are extremely common; one study in the coastal waters of southwestern Australia found that the four most abundant stingaree species constituted over 17% of the biomass of benthic fishes.

== Description ==
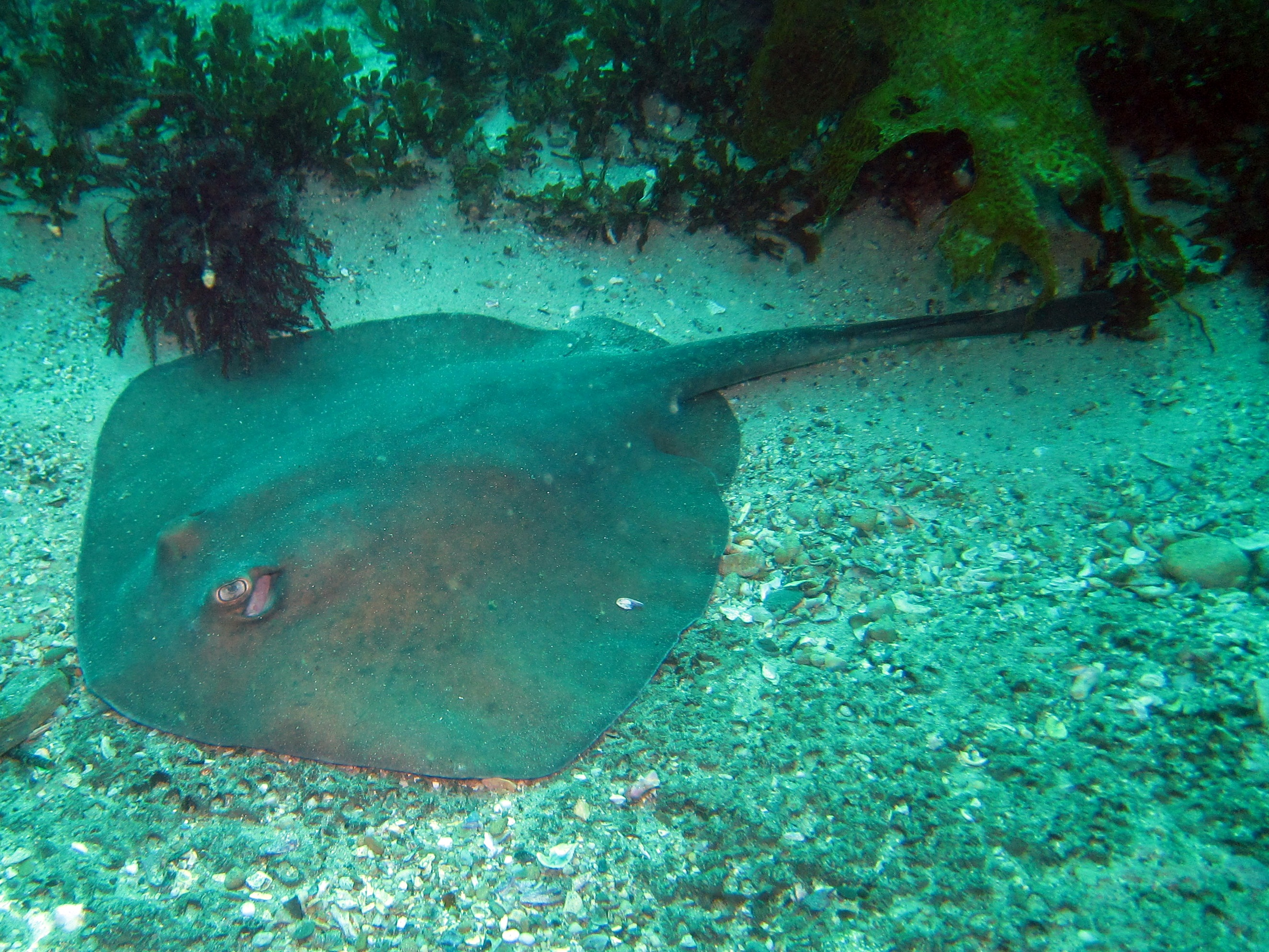
The eastern shovelnose stingaree (T. imitata), which has a rounded disc and no dorsal fin or lateral skin folds on its tail.

Stingarees are modestly sized, ranging from 30 to 80 cm (12 to 31 in) long. They have greatly enlarged pectoral fins fused to the head, forming a disc that may be nearly circular, to oval, to rhomboid in shape. The snout is usually short and does not protrude much from the disc. The eyes are placed atop the disc and usually fairly large; immediately posterior are teardrop-shaped spiracles (auxiliary respiratory openings). There is a curtain of skin between the nostrils, formed from the fusion of the anterior nasal flaps, that reaches the mouth. There are varying numbers of papillae (nipple-like structures) on the floor of the mouth and sometimes also on the outside of the lower jaw. The teeth in both jaws are small, with rhomboid bases and blunt to pointed crowns; they are arranged with a quincunx pattern and number less than 50 rows in either jaw. The five pairs of gill slits are short and located beneath the disc.

The pelvic fins are small with rounded margins; claspers are found on males. The tail is shorter than to about equal to the disc, either flattened or thickly oval in cross-section, and ends in a leaf-shaped, symmetrical caudal fin. One or two relatively large, serrated stinging spines are placed atop the tail about halfway along its length. Some species have a small dorsal fin immediately before the spine, and/or lateral skin folds running along either side of the tail. All species lack dermal denticles (except for the New Ireland stingaree, U. armatus). Stingarees are generally shades of yellow, green, brown or gray above and pale below; some species are plain, while others are adorned with spots, rings, blotches, lines, or more complex patterns.

== Biology and ecology ==
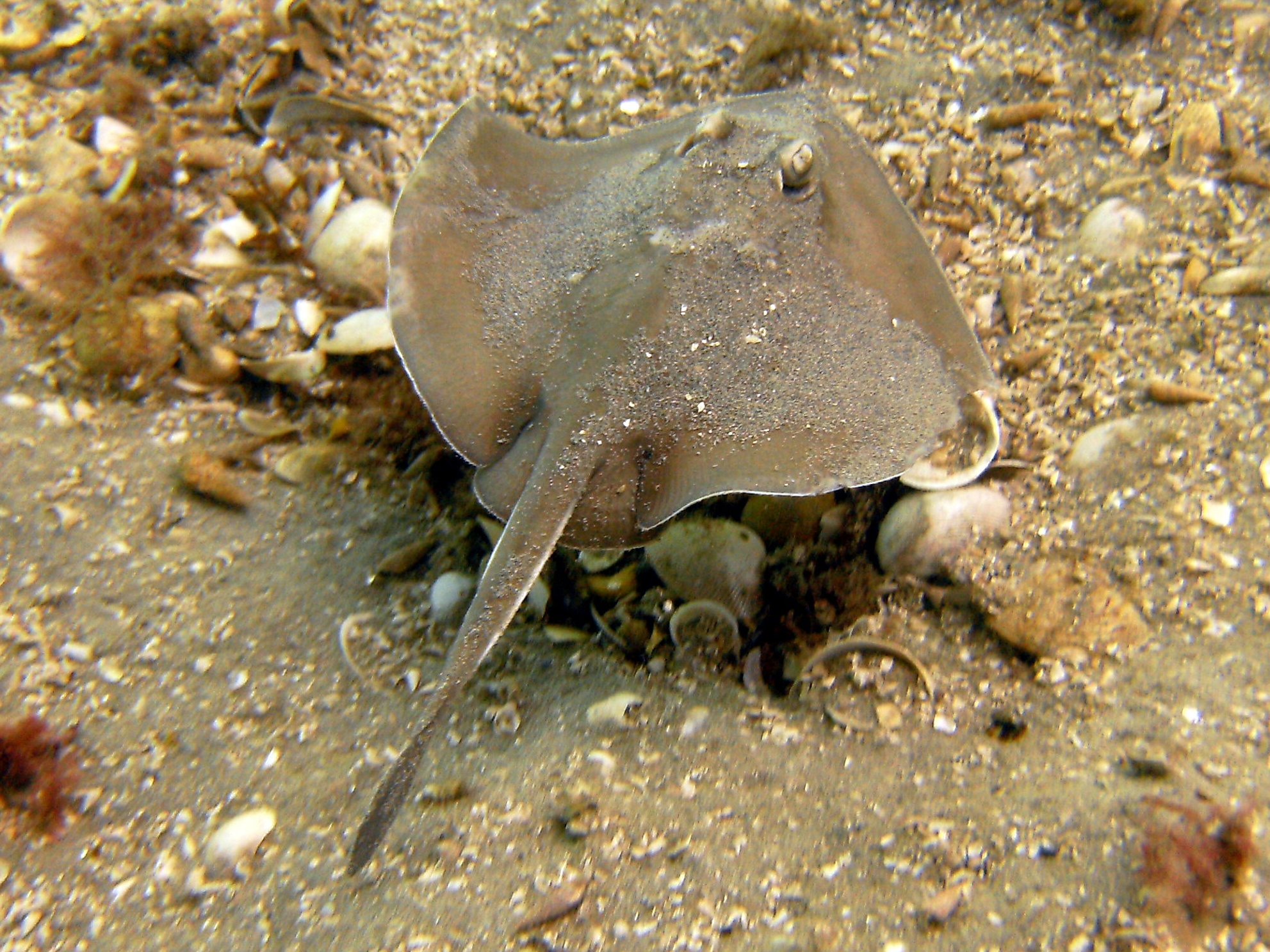
One of the most common stingarees off southern Australia, the sparsely-spotted stingaree (U. paucimaculatus) feeds mainly on crustaceans.

Stingarees are slow swimmers that can often be found lying still on the bottom, sometimes partly or completely buried in sediment. They are predators of small benthic and burrowing invertebrates such as crustaceans and polychaete worms, and also occasionally small bony fishes. Studies have shown that stingarees that overlap in range differ in their diet composition, which likely serves to reduce competition. For example, off southwestern Australia the masked stingaree (T. personata) and western shovelnose stingaree (T. mucosa) feed mostly on different types of polychaetes, while the sparsely-spotted stingaree (U. paucimaculatus) and lobed stingaree (U. lobatus) feed mostly on different types of crustaceans.

Like other myliobatiforms, stingarees have a viviparous mode of reproduction in which the embryos hatch within the uterus and are nourished first by yolk, and later by histotroph ("uterine milk") produced by the mother and likely delivered through specialized extensions of the uterine epithelium called "trophonemata". For those species whose life histories have been investigated, the gestation period lasts 10–12 months and the litter size is small, no more than one or two in some cases. The small litter is likely due to the relatively large size of stingaree pups, which measure around half the maximum size at birth.

== Human interactions ==
Though generally innocuous towards humans, when disturbed stingarees can inflict a painful wound with their stout, venomous stings. Species differ in temperament; the sparse-spotted stingaree (U. paucimaculatus) is reportedly more aggressive, and the spotted stingaree (U. gigas) less so. When threatened, the crossback stingaree (U. cruciatus) raises its tail over its disc like a scorpion. Some species of stingarees are regularly caught incidentally in bottom trawls by commercial fisheries. They are generally discarded due to their small size, though some may be processed into fishmeal. Stingarees caught from shallow water likely have relatively high chances of survival, but of concern is their tendency to abort any gestating young when captured and handled.
