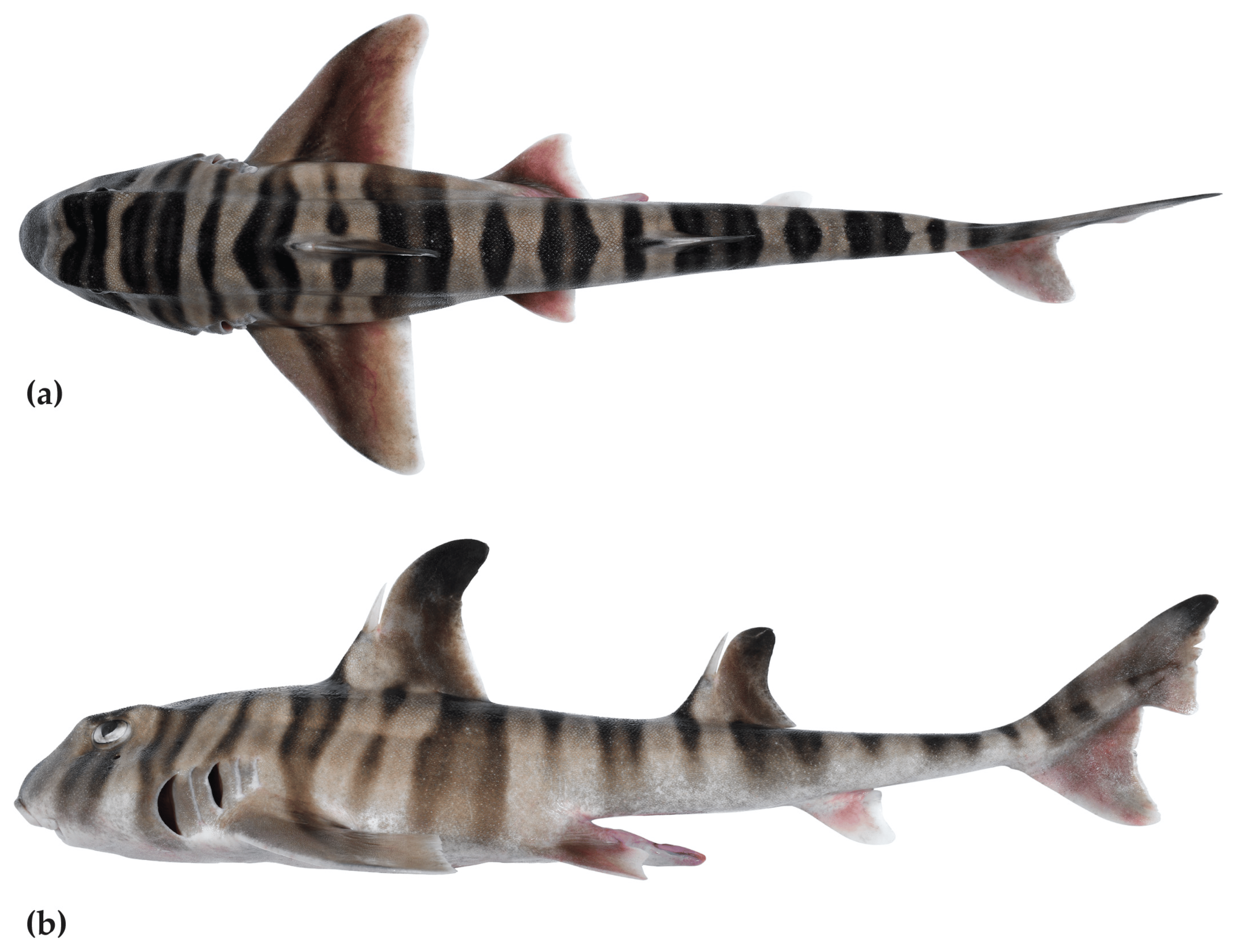
- Holotype (adolescent male). a, dorsal view; b, lateral view

Scientific classification
- Kingdom: Animalia
- Phylum: Chordata
- Class: Chondrichthyes
- Subclass: Elasmobranchii
- Division: Selachii
- Order: Heterodontiformes
- Family: Heterodontidae
- Genus: Heterodontus
- Species: H. marshallae

Binomial name
- Heterodontus marshallae White, Mollen, O'Neill, Yang & Naylor, 2023

= Painted hornshark =

Species of fish

The painted hornshark (Heterodontus marshallae) is a species of bullhead shark from northwestern Australia, described in 2023. It was previously considered conspecific with the Zebra bullhead shark. It is found from North West Cape to Bathurst Island.

The painted hornshark looks much like a zebra shark with its dark bar and saddle coloring as shown, but the coloring of the tip of the snout and its fins is the difference between the two.
