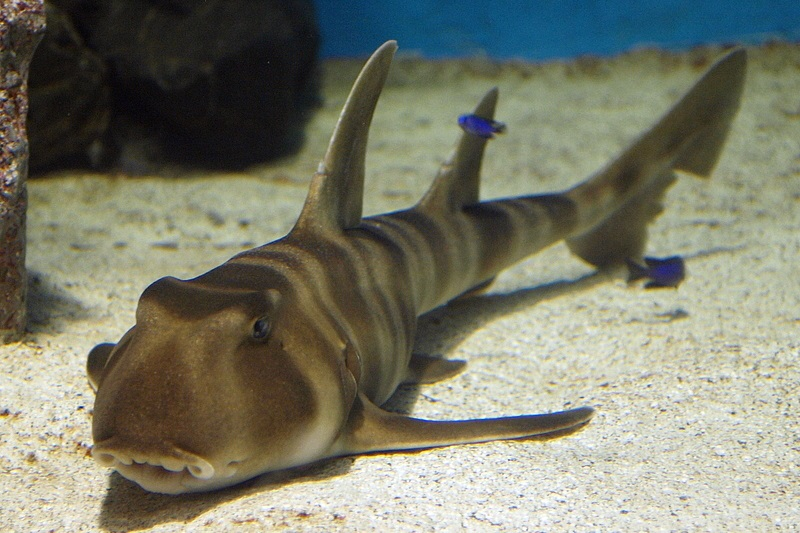

Conservation status
- Least Concern (IUCN 3.1)

Scientific classification
- Kingdom: Animalia
- Phylum: Chordata
- Class: Chondrichthyes
- Subclass: Elasmobranchii
- Division: Selachii
- Order: Heterodontiformes
- Family: Heterodontidae
- Genus: Heterodontus
- Species: H. japonicus

Binomial name
- Heterodontus japonicus Maclay & W. J. Macleay, 1884
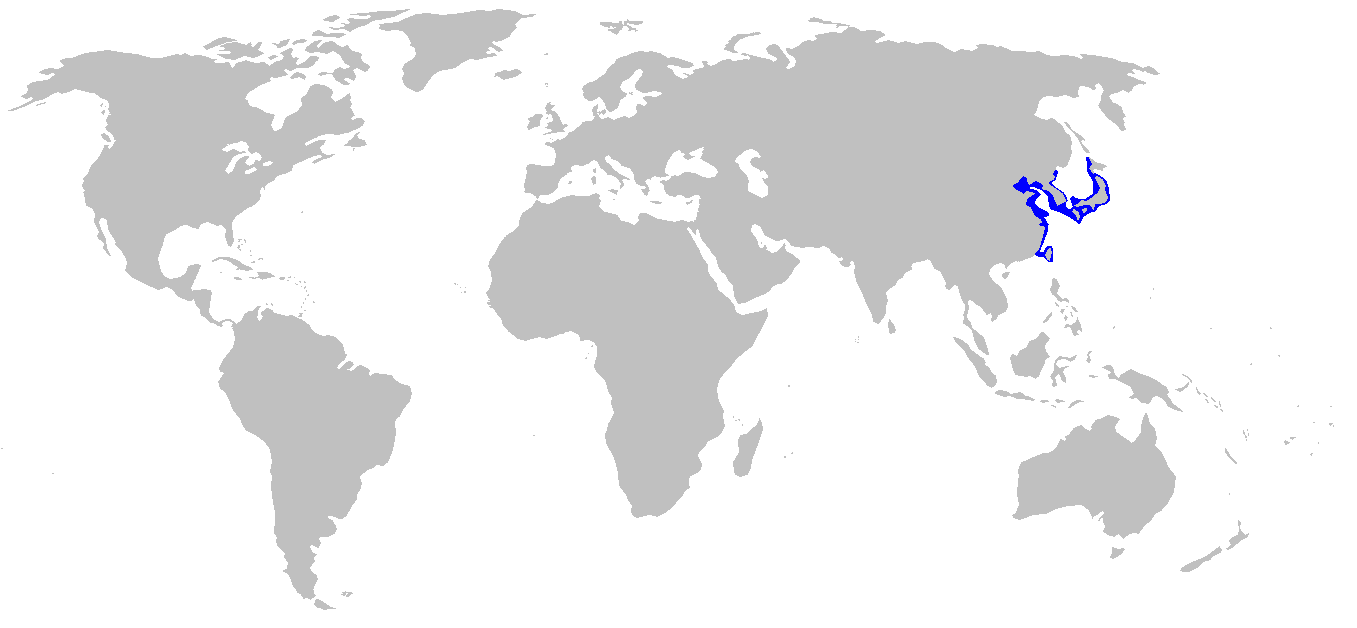
- Range of the Japanese bullhead shark

Synonyms
- Cestracion japonicus Maclay & Macleay, 1884

= Japanese bullhead shark =

Species of shark

The Japanese bullhead shark (Heterodontus japonicus) is a species of bullhead shark in the family Heterodontidae found in the northwestern Pacific Ocean off the coasts of Japan, Korea, and China. This benthic shark occurs at depths of 6–37 m (20–121 ft) over rocky bottoms or kelp beds. Measuring up to 1.2 m (3.9 ft) long, it can be identified by its short, blunt head, two high dorsal fins with anterior spines, and pattern of irregularly shaped, vertical brown bands and stripes. The Japanese bullhead shark is a docile, slow-swimming species that feeds mainly on shelled invertebrates and small bony fishes. Reproduction is oviparous, with females laying spiral-flanged eggs in communal "nests". This species is of little interest to fisheries.

== Taxonomy ==
The Japanese bullhead shark was originally described as Cestracion japonicus by ichthyologists Nicholas Miklouho-Maclay and William John Macleay, in an 1884 volume of Proceedings of the Linnean Society of New South Wales. The type specimen is a female caught off Tokyo. Other common names used for this species include bull head, cat shark, Japanese horn shark, Cestracion shark, and Port Jackson shark (which usually refers to Heterodontus portusjacksoni).

== Description ==
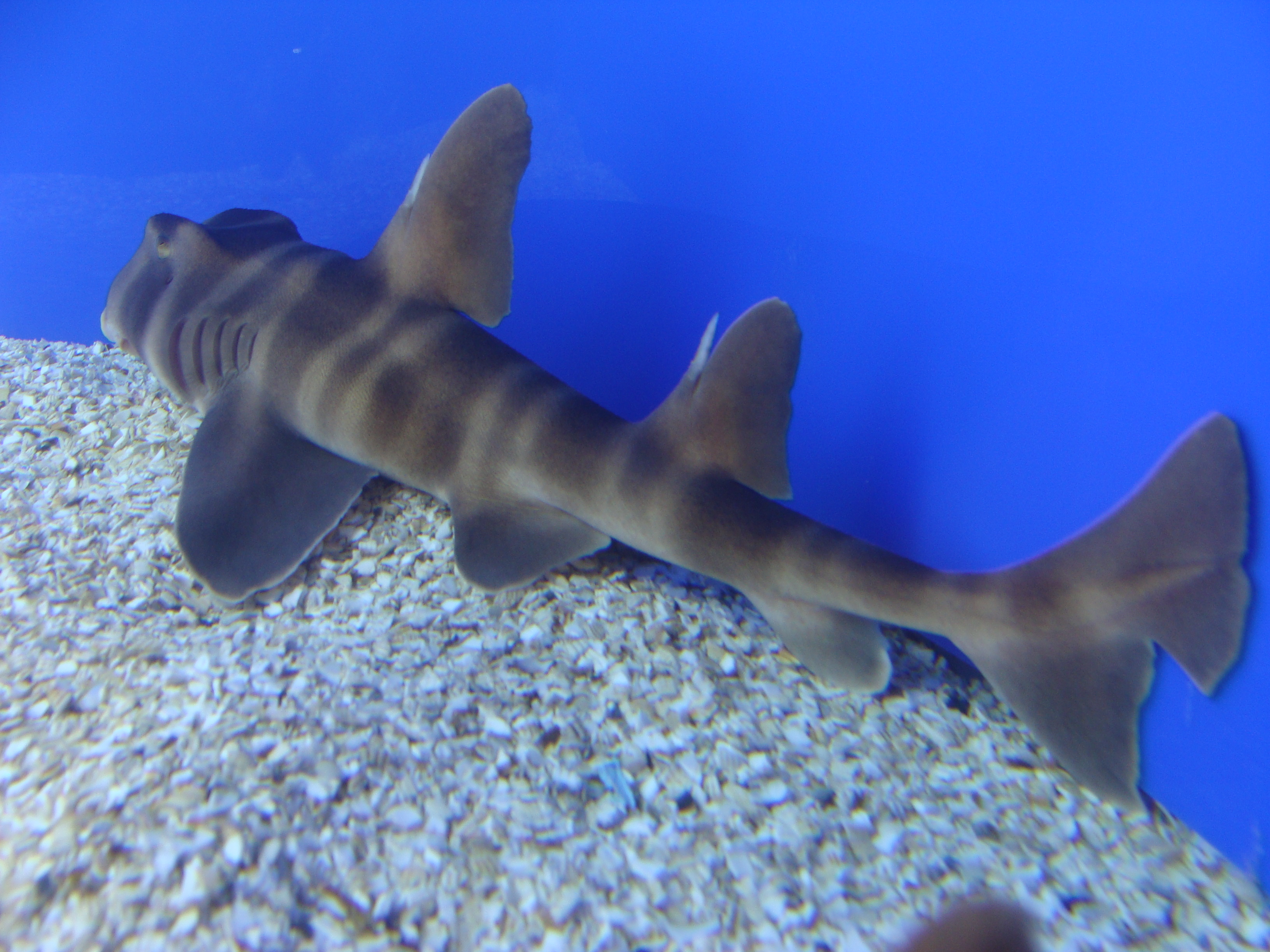
The color pattern of the Japanese bullhead shark distinguish it from similar species.

A modest-sized shark reaching a maximum known length of 1.2 m (3.9 ft), the Japanese bullhead shark has a cylindrical body with the short, wide head and blunt, pig-like snout typical of the bullhead sharks. The eyes lack a nictitating membrane and are followed by tiny spiracles. Shallow supraorbital ridges are present above the eyes, and the space between them is slightly concave. The nostrils are divided into incurrent and excurrent openings by long flaps of skin that reach the mouth; the incurrent opening is encircled by a groove while another groove runs from the excurrent opening to the mouth. The small mouth is positioned nearly at the tip of the snout; the front teeth are small with a sharp central cusp flanked by a pair of lateral cusplets, while the back teeth are broad and rounded. There are deep furrows at the corners of the mouth, extending onto both jaws. Despite the research done, the morphology is not well understood. A recent research shows that the spiracle of elasmobranchs is a gill-slit derived tube located behind the eye.

The first dorsal fin is very large and high, and is somewhat falcate (sickle-shaped); it originates over the bases of the pectoral fins. The second dorsal fin is much smaller, but similar in shape, and originates over the rear tips of the pelvic fins. Both dorsal fins bear stout spines on their leading edges. The pectoral fins are large; the pelvic fins are much smaller than the first dorsal fin. The anal fin is placed well in front of the caudal fin, which is broad with a short lower lobe and a long upper lobe bearing a strong ventral notch near the tip. The dermal denticles are large and rough, particularly on the sides of the body. The coloration is light brown, with a series of diffuse-edged, darker wide bands interspersed with narrower stripes from snout to tail, numbering 11–14 in all. A faint lighter band is on top of the head between the eyes, and a darker blotch is beneath each eye.

== Distribution and habitat ==
The range of the Japanese bullhead shark extends from Japan to the Korean Peninsula, and southward along the coast of China to Taiwan. A single, apparently erroneous, record from off East Africa is reported. This bottom-dwelling shark inhabits the continental shelf at a depth of 6–37 m (20–121 ft), preferring areas covered by rocks, rocky reefs, or kelp.

== Biology and ecology ==
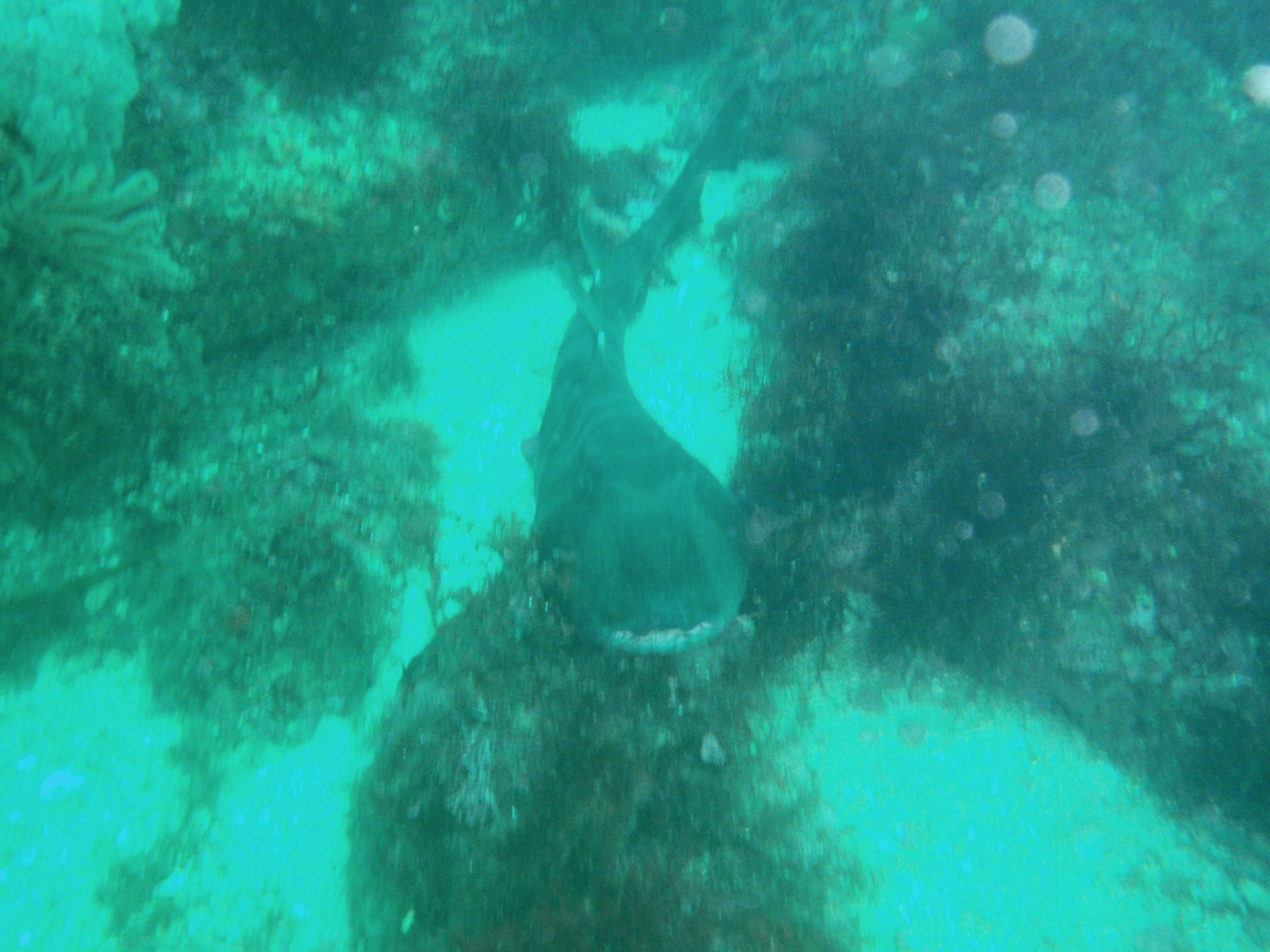
A Japanese bullhead shark off Kawana, Japan

The Japanese bullhead shark is a slow-moving predator that feeds on crustaceans, molluscs, small fishes, and sea urchins, often hunting for them while "walking" along the sea bottom with alternating motions of its pectoral and pelvic fins. When prey is found, it is seized with highly protrusible jaws and ground to pieces with the molar-like rear teeth. Known parasites of this species include the copepod Dissonus pastinum, and the haemogregarine protozoan Haemogregarina heterodontii.

Like other members of its family, the Japanese bullhead shark is oviparous. Females produce large egg capsules bearing thin flanges spiraling three times around the outside and a pair of short tendrils at the tip. The eggs are deposited at a depth of 8–9 m (26–30 ft) within beds of rock or kelp. Several females may spawn communally in a single "nest", which may contain up to 15 eggs total, though the females abandon the site afterward. In Japanese waters, females lay pairs of eggs 6–12 times between March and September, with a peak in spawning activity in March and April. The eggs take about a year to hatch; the newborns measure 18 cm (7.1 in) long. Young sharks have proportionately higher dorsal fins and a similar but brighter color pattern than adults. Males attain sexual maturity at a length of 69 cm (27 in).

== Human interactions ==
Harmless to humans, the Japanese bullhead shark can be easily hand-caught by divers. It is of only minor fisheries interest as a source of food in Japan and likely elsewhere. It is also exhibited in Japanese public aquariums. The conservation status of this species has not been evaluated by the International Union for Conservation of Nature (IUCN). It has apparently disappeared from offshore waters in the Bohai Sea, possibly as a consequence of climate change.
