= Oman bullhead shark =

Conservation status
- Data Deficient (IUCN 3.1)

Scientific classification
- Kingdom: Animalia
- Phylum: Chordata
- Class: Chondrichthyes
- Subclass: Elasmobranchii
- Division: Selachii
- Order: Heterodontiformes
- Family: Heterodontidae
- Genus: Heterodontus
- Species: H. omanensis

Binomial name
- Heterodontus omanensis Z. H. Baldwin, 2005
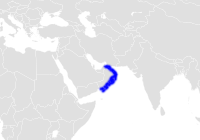
- Range of the Oman bullhead shark

Species of shark

The Oman bullhead shark, Heterodontus omanensis, is a bullhead shark of the family Heterodontidae found in the tropical western Indian Ocean around central Oman, from the surface to a depth of 72 m (236 ft) on the continental shelf. This species has an average length of 56 cm (22 in) and can reach a maximum length of 61 cm (24 in). This shark was described in 2005, making it one of the most recently described of its genus. The Oman bullhead shark likely is accidentally caught as bycatch, putting the species at risk.
