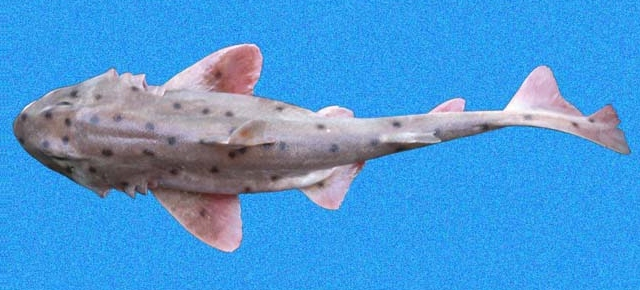
- Scientific field drawing

Conservation status
- Least Concern (IUCN 3.1)

Scientific classification
- Kingdom: Animalia
- Phylum: Chordata
- Class: Chondrichthyes
- Subclass: Elasmobranchii
- Division: Selachii
- Order: Heterodontiformes
- Family: Heterodontidae
- Genus: Heterodontus
- Species: H. mexicanus

Binomial name
- Heterodontus mexicanus L. R. Taylor & Castro-Aguirre, 1972
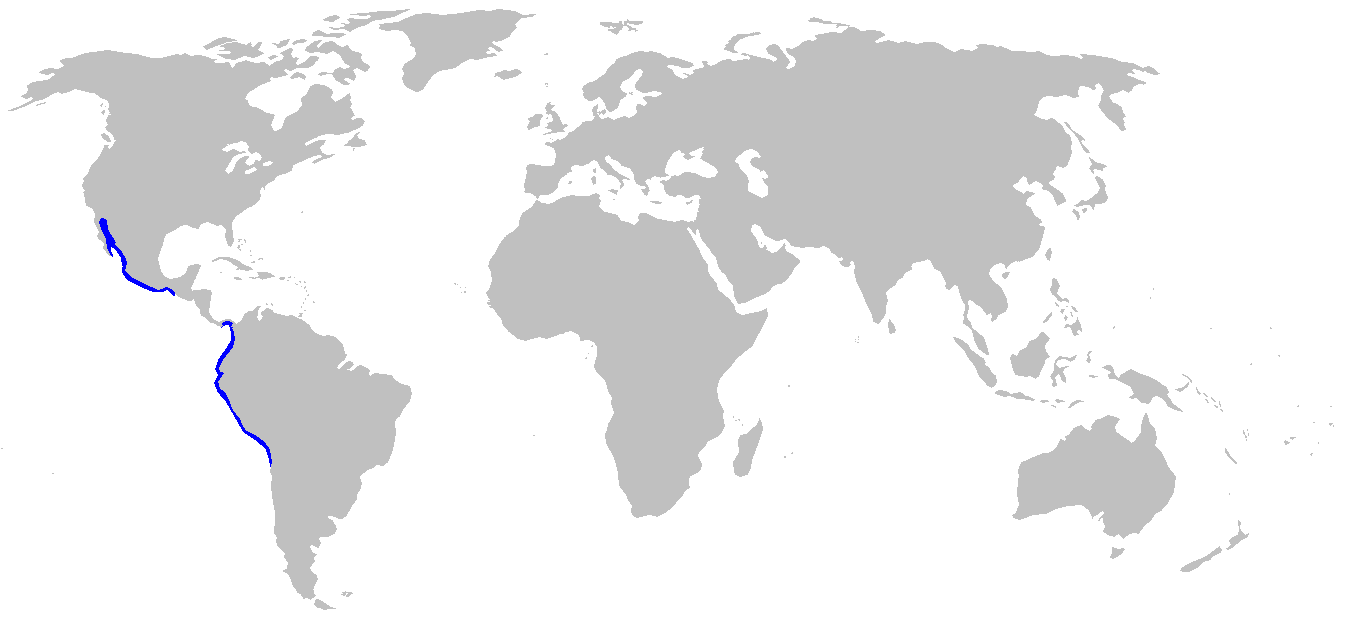
- Range of Mexican bullhead shark (in blue)

= Mexican hornshark =

Species of shark

The Mexican hornshark (Heterodontus mexicanus) is a bullhead shark of the family Heterodontidae. This shark is grey-brown in color, with black spots scattered on the fins and body. It has a cylindrical trunk, conical head, and small spiracles behind the eyes. The snout of the Mexican hornshark is very round and blunt. Like all members of the order Heterodontiformes, this shark has fin spines in front of both of its dorsal fins. The first dorsal fin originates before the pectoral fins, while the second dorsal fin originates behind the pelvic fins. The Mexican hornshark reaches a maximum length around 70 cm, but usually reaches between 50 and 60 cm on average. Young hornsharks hatch around 14 cm.

== Habitat and range ==
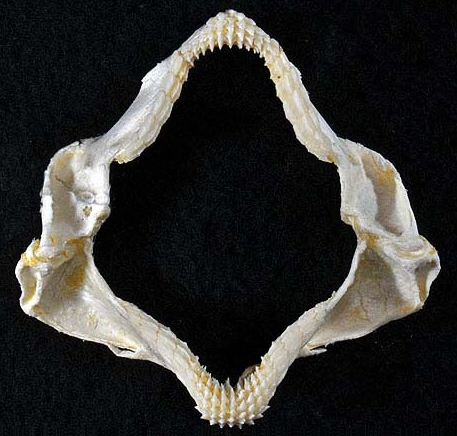
Jaws

Mexican hornsharks are widely distributed throughout the coast of the Eastern Pacific, mainly around southern Baja California, and possibly as far south as Peru. The rocky bottoms, coral reefs, and sandy areas of the littoral zone create the habitat of this hornshark. The Mexican hornshark can be found at a maximum depth of around 50 m, but is usually found down to 20 m.

== Behavior ==
Like all members of the order Heterodontiformes, the Mexican hornshark is oviparous. After an unknown gestation period, the female attaches an unknown number of spiral-shaped egg cases to rocks on the sea floor. The length of the incubation period of these egg cases is also unknown. Not much about the feeding habits of the Mexican hornshark is known, but it most likely feeds on shelled invertebrates. Because of its size, this shark poses no danger to humans.

== Conservation ==
The Mexican hornshark is listed as least concern by the IUCN Red List. This shark is not considered to have commercial value, but it is at risk nonetheless because it is taken as bycatch by fishing operations that use bottom gillnets. Mexican hornsharks caught as bycatch are either discarded or used in fishmeal. If released back into the water, these sharks are hardy enough to survive, but unfortunately, many discarded hornsharks are left on beaches to die. Overall, the threat to Mexican hornsharks is considerable, as their range is restricted and they are frequently caught.
