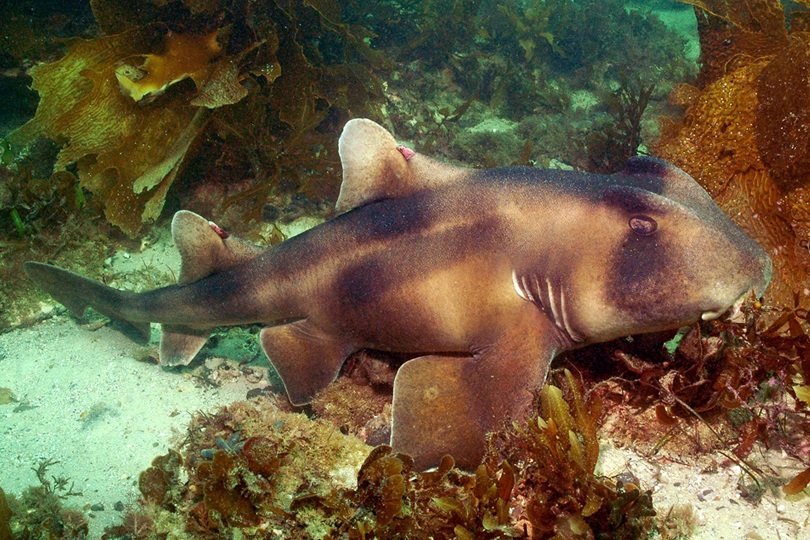

Conservation status
- Least Concern (IUCN 3.1)

Scientific classification
- Kingdom: Animalia
- Phylum: Chordata
- Class: Chondrichthyes
- Subclass: Elasmobranchii
- Division: Selachii
- Order: Heterodontiformes
- Family: Heterodontidae
- Genus: Heterodontus
- Species: H. galeatus

Binomial name
- Heterodontus galeatus (Günther, 1870)
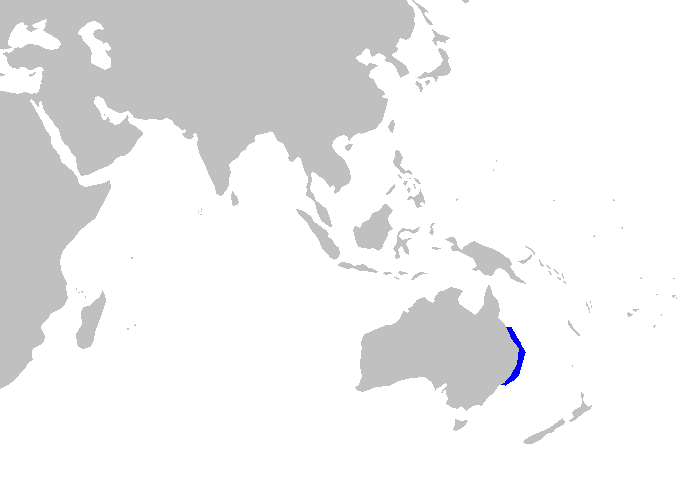
- Range of the crested bullhead shark

Synonyms
- Cestracion galeatus Günther, 1870

= Crested bullhead shark =

Species of shark

The crested bullhead shark (Heterodontus galeatus) is an uncommon species of bullhead shark, in the family Heterodontidae. It lives off the coast of eastern Australia from the coast to a depth of 93 m (305 ft). This shark can be distinguished from other members of its family by the large size of the ridges above its eyes and by its color pattern of large dark blotches. It typically attains a length of 1.2 m (3.9 ft).

Nocturnal and bottom-dwelling, the crested bullhead shark favors rocky reefs and vegetated areas, where it hunts for sea urchins and other small organisms. It is oviparous, with females producing spiral-shaped egg capsules that are secured to seaweed or sponges with long tendrils. Sexual maturation is slow, with one female in captivity not laying eggs until almost 12 years of age. The International Union for Conservation of Nature has assessed this harmless shark as of Least Concern; it is of no economic interest and suffers minimal mortality from bycatch, recreational fishing, and shark nets.

== Taxonomy ==
British zoologist Albert Günther originally described the crested bullhead shark as Cestracion galeatus in the 1870 eighth volume of Catalogue of the Fishes in the British Museum. He chose the specific epithet galeatus from the Latin for "helmeted", referring to the prominent ridges above the shark's eyes that also give it its common name.

Subsequent authors moved this species to the genera Gyropleurodus and Molochophrys before placing it in Heterodontus. The type specimen is a 68-cm-long female caught off Australia. This shark may also be referred to as crested shark, crested bull shark, crested horn shark, and crested Port Jackson shark.

== Description ==
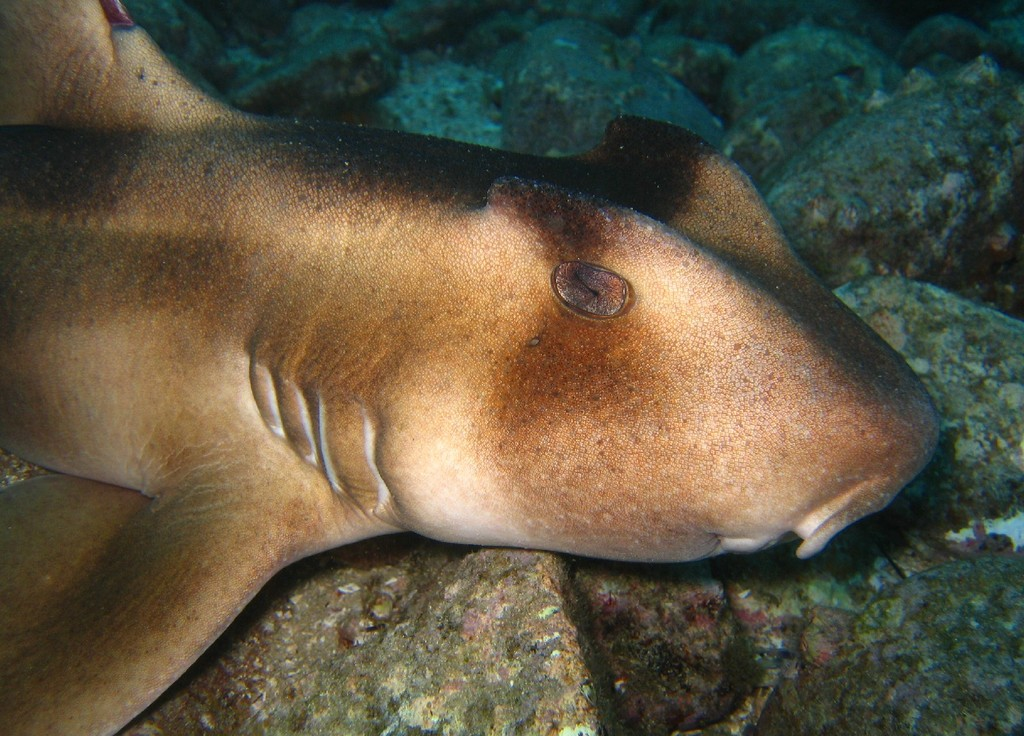
The high ridges above the eyes of the crested bullhead shark are its most distinctive feature.

The head of the crested bullhead shark is short and wide, with a blunt, pig-like snout. The eyes are placed high on the head and lack nictitating membranes. The supraorbital ridges above the eyes of this species are larger than any other member of its family. The nostrils are separated into incurrent and excurrent openings by a long flap of skin that reaches the mouth. A furrow encircles the incurrent opening and another furrow runs from the excurrent opening to the mouth, which is located nearly at the tip of the snout. The teeth at the front of the jaws are small and pointed with a central cusp and two lateral cusplets, while those at the back of the jaws are wide and molar-like. The deep furrows at the corners of the mouth extend onto both jaws.

The pectoral fins are large and rounded, while the pelvic and anal fins are smaller and more angular. The first dorsal fin is moderately tall with a rounded to angular apex and a stout spine on the leading margin, originating behind the pectoral fins. The second dorsal fin resembles the first and is almost as large, and is located between the pelvic and anal fins. The caudal fin is broad, with a strong ventral notch near the tip of the upper lobe. The dermal denticles are large and rough, especially on the flanks. The coloration consists of five brown to black, diffusely edged saddles on a light tan background. There are dark marks on top of the head between the crests and below each eye. Most crested bullhead sharks measure no more than 1.2 m (4 ft) long, but a few may reach 1.5 m (5 ft).

== Distribution and habitat ==
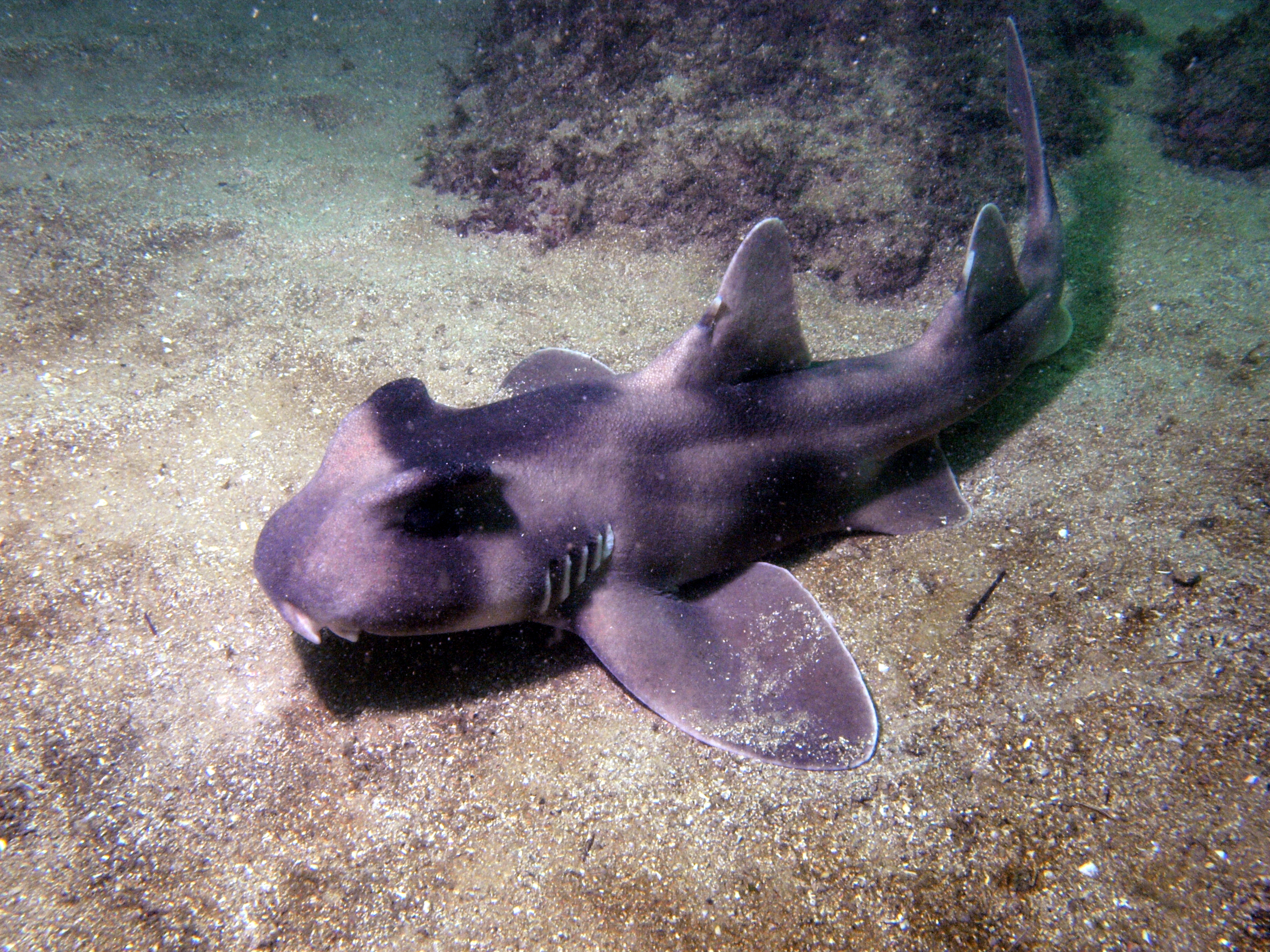
The crested bullhead shark is found on or near the bottom.

The range of the crested bullhead shark is restricted to the warm temperate waters along the eastern coast of Australia, from Cape Moreton, Queensland, to Batemans Bay, New South Wales. Also dubious records exist of this species from off Cape York Peninsula in the north and Tasmania in the south. This species co-occurs with the related Port Jackson shark (H. portusjacksoni) across much of its range, but is generally much rarer except off southern Queensland and northern New South Wales, where it tends to replace the other species.

Bottom-dwelling in nature, the crested bullhead shark is found over the continental shelf from the intertidal zone to a depth of 93 m (305 ft), being more common in deeper waters. It prefers rocky reefs, mats of seaweed, and seagrass beds.

== Biology and ecology ==
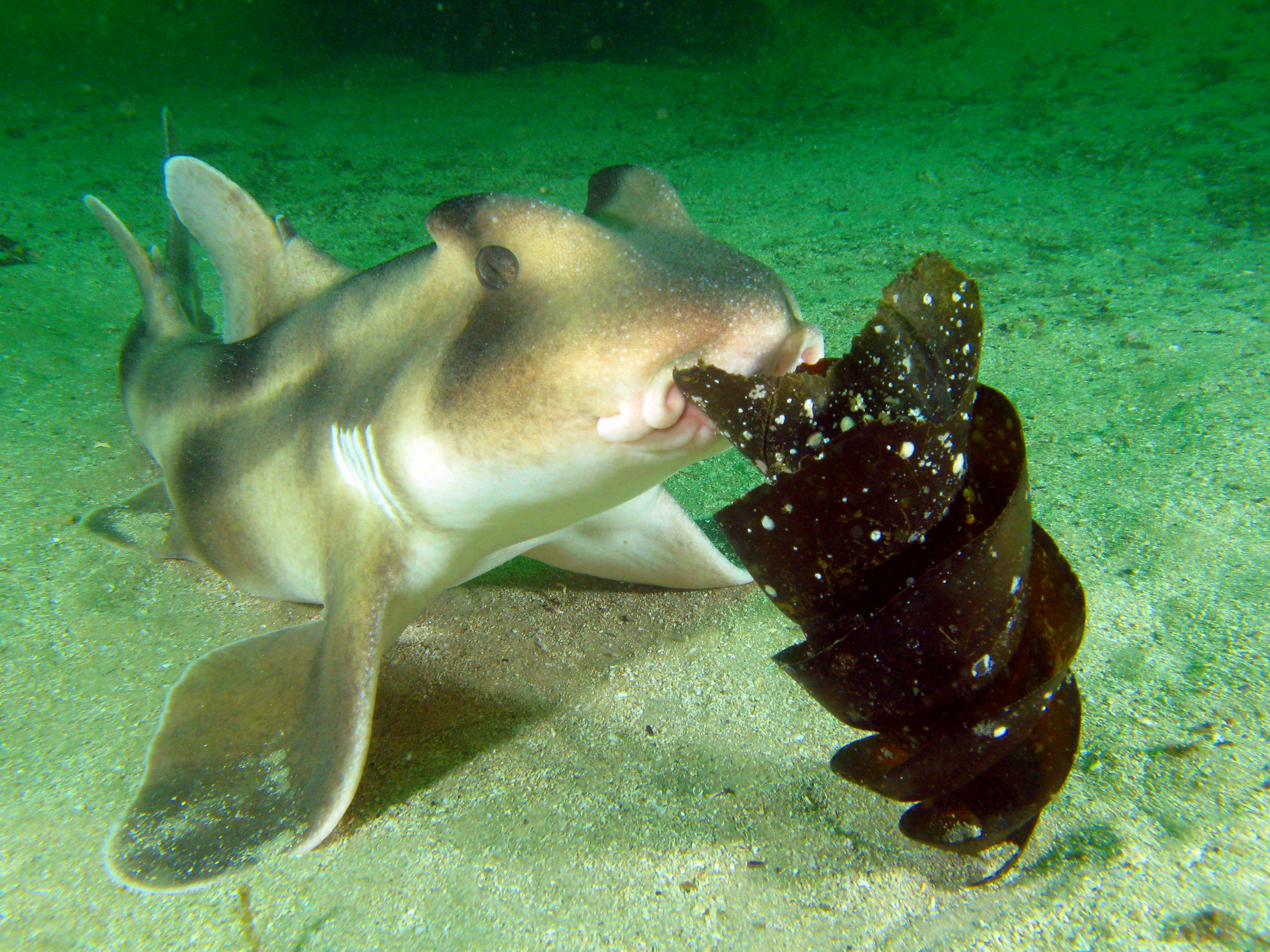
A crested bullhead shark feeding on an egg of the Port Jackson shark.

The crested bullhead shark is a slow-moving, nocturnal species often seen wedging its head between rocks in search of food. It feeds primarily on the sea urchins Centrostephanus rodgersii and Heliocidaris erythrogramma, but has also been known to take a variety of other invertebrates and small fishes. A steady diet of sea urchins may stain the teeth of this shark pinkish purple. The crested bullhead shark is also a major predator of the eggs of the Port Jackson shark, which are seasonally available and rich in nutrients. Individual sharks have been observed taking the egg capsules in their mouths and chewing on the tough casing, rupturing it and allowing the contents to be sucked out; egg capsules may also be swallowed whole. Unlike the Port Jackson shark, the crested bullhead shark is not known to form large aggregations.

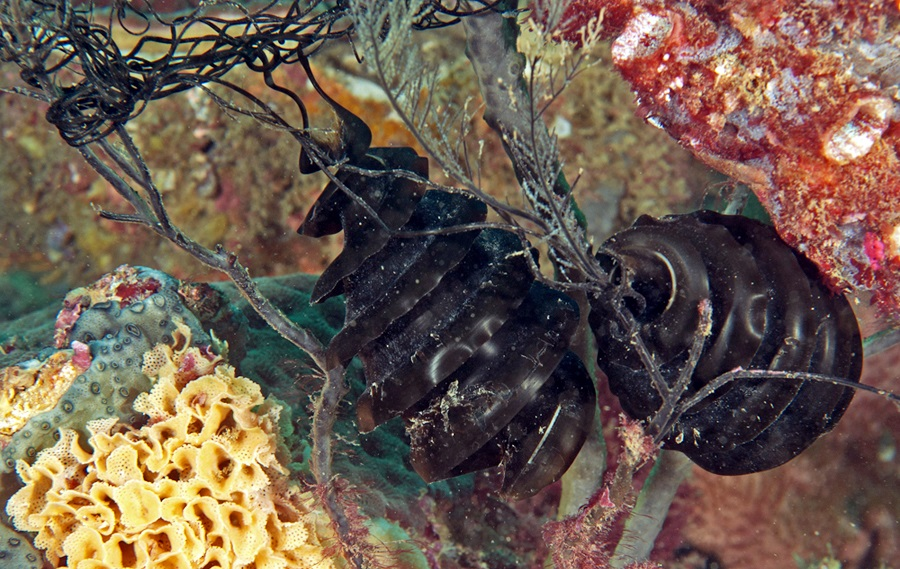
The egg case of the crested bullhead shark has distinctive, long tendrils at one end.

Crested bullhead sharks are oviparous with a possibly annual reproductive cycle. Females produce 10–16 eggs per year during late winter in July and August, though Michael (1993) noted that egg-laying may continue year-round. The egg cases measure around 11 cm (4.3 in) in length, with a pair of thin flanges spiraling 6–7 times around the outside and two slender tendrils up to 2 m (6.6 ft) long at one end, used to attach the capsule to seaweed or sponges. The capsules are usually deposited at a depth of 20–30 m (66–98 ft), much deeper than the Port Jackson shark, though there is a single record of an egg being found only 8.6 m (28 ft) down. The time to hatching has been variously reported as 5 and 8–9 months; the newly emerged young measure 17–22 cm (6.7–8.7 in) long and resemble the adults. Last and Stevens (1994) gave the lengths at maturity for males and females at 60 cm (24 in) and 70 cm (28 in), respectively, though mature males as small as 53.5 cm (21.1 in) long were later found off Queensland. Growth and aging has been documented for one captive female at the Taronga Park Aquarium, which grew an average of 5 cm (2.0 in) per year and did not lay eggs until she was almost 12 years old.

== Human interactions ==
Inoffensive towards humans, the crested bullhead shark is of little interest to recreational or commercial fisheries. It is seldom caught on hook-and-line. Commercial bottom trawl prawn fisheries operating off Queensland and New South Wales take this species as bycatch; the impact of these activities on the population is uncertain as this species is not recorded separately from the Port Jackson shark. However, most bullhead sharks caught in these fisheries survive to be released alive. Crested bullhead sharks are likely also caught in mesh shark nets used to protect beaches; again, most are able to survive the experience.

Because of the limited mortality suffered by this species from various human activities, the International Union for Conservation of Nature has assessed this species as of Least Concern, albeit also recommending that it be carefully monitored given its restricted distribution and overall uncommonness. The range of the crested bullhead shark overlaps with several marine protected areas; additionally, it was listed as a declared animal in Schedule 3 of the 1997 Queensland Marine Parks (Moreton Bay) Zoning Plan, which regulates its collection in Moreton Bay Marine Park.
