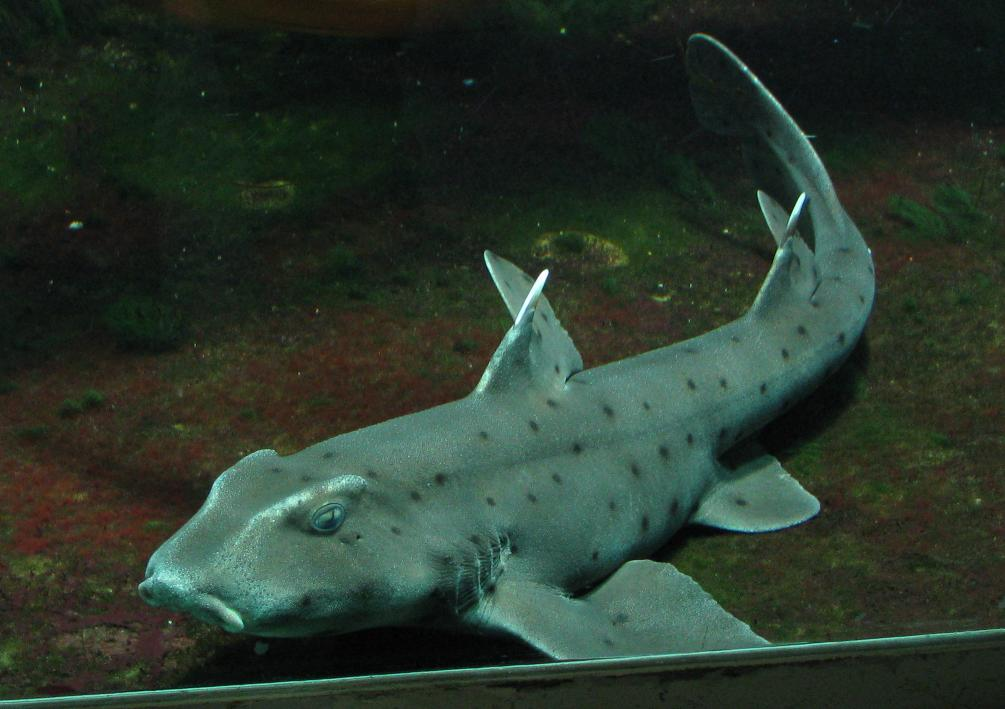

Conservation status
- Least Concern (IUCN 3.1)

Scientific classification
- Kingdom: Animalia
- Phylum: Chordata
- Class: Chondrichthyes
- Subclass: Elasmobranchii
- Division: Selachii
- Order: Heterodontiformes
- Family: Heterodontidae
- Genus: Heterodontus
- Species: H. francisci

Binomial name
- Heterodontus francisci (Girard, 1855)
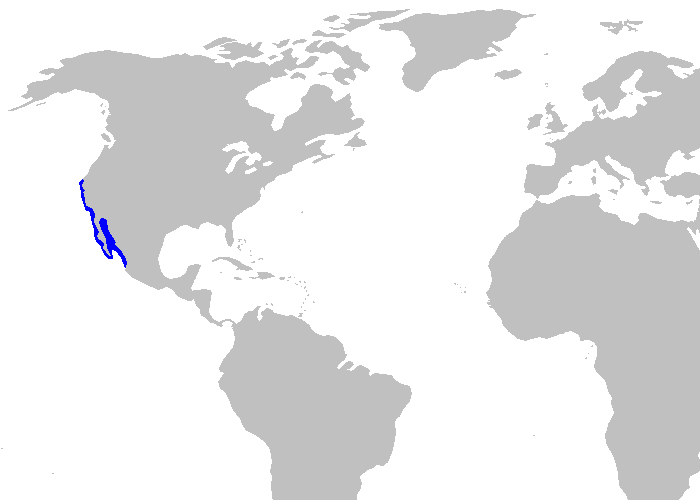
- Range of the horn shark

Synonyms
- Cestracion francisci Girard, 1855

= Horn shark =

Species of shark

The horn shark (Heterodontus francisci) is a species of bullhead shark, in the family Heterodontidae. It is endemic to the coastal waters off the western coast of North America, from California to the Gulf of California. Young sharks are segregated spatially from the adults, with the former preferring deeper sandy flats and the latter preferring shallower rocky reefs or algal beds. A small species typically measuring 1 m (3.3 ft) in length, the horn shark can be recognized by a short, blunt head with ridges over its eyes, two high dorsal fins with large spines, and a brown or gray coloration with many small dark spots.

Slow-moving, generally solitary predators, horn sharks hunt at night inside small home ranges and retreat to a favored shelter during the day. Their daily activity cycles are controlled by environmental light levels. Adult sharks prey mainly on hard-shelled molluscs, echinoderms, and crustaceans, which they crush between powerful jaws and molar-like teeth, while also feeding opportunistically on a wide variety of other invertebrates and small bony fishes. Juveniles prefer softer-bodied prey such as polychaete worms and sea anemones. The shark extracts its prey from the substrate using suction and, if necessary, levering motions with its body. Reproduction is oviparous, with females laying up to 24 eggs from February to April. After laying, the female picks up the auger-shaped egg cases and wedges them into crevices to protect them from predators.

Horn sharks are harmless unless harassed, and are readily maintained in captivity. They are not targeted by either commercial or recreational fisheries, though small numbers are caught as bycatch. In Mexico this species is used for food and fishmeal, and in California its spines are made into jewelry. The International Union for Conservation of Nature (IUCN) does not yet have enough information to determine the horn shark's conservation status. It faces few threats off the coast of the United States. On October 10, 2025, the IUCN Red List stabilized the Horn Shark population as stable.

== Taxonomy ==
The French biologist Charles Frédéric Girard published the first scientific description of the horn shark under the name Cestracion francisci in 1855, in the Proceedings of the Academy of Natural Sciences of Philadelphia. This species was later placed in the genus Gyropleurodus, which was eventually synonymized with the genus Heterodontus. The specific epithet francisci is a reference to San Francisco, although the range of the horn shark does not extend that far north. The type specimen from Monterey Bay has since been lost. The scientific name for this species has been given erroneously as Heterodontus californicus.

== Description ==
Like other bullhead sharks, the horn shark has a short, wide head with a blunt snout and prominent supraorbital ridges over the eyes. The horn shark's supraorbital ridges are low and terminate abruptly; the space between them on top of the head is deeply concave. Each eye lacks a nictitating membrane and is followed by a tiny spiracle. The nostrils are split into inflow and outflow openings by a long flap that reaches the mouth. The inflow openings are encircled by a groove, while another groove connects the outflow openings to the mouth. The mouth is small and curved, with prominent furrows at the corners. There are 19–26 tooth rows in the upper jaw and 18–29 tooth rows in the lower jaw. The teeth at the front of the jaws are small and pointed, with a central cusp flanked by a pair of lateral cusplets; those at the sides of the jaws are much larger, elongated lengthwise, and molar-like.

The body is cylindrical, with two high, somewhat falcate (sickle-shaped) dorsal fins bearing stout spines at the front. The fin spines of reef-dwelling horn sharks are shorter than those living in algal habitats, as their spines become worn down on rocks from the sharks' movements. The first dorsal fin originates over the bases of the large pectoral fins, while the second dorsal fin originates slightly anterior to the free rear tips of the pelvic fins. The caudal fin has a short lower lobe and a long, broad upper lobe with a strong notch near the tip. The horn shark's dermal denticles are small and smooth, numbering some 200/cm^{2} on the back in adults. The dorsal coloration consists of various shades of gray or brown with many small dark spots, though these may be absent in older sharks; the underside is yellowish. There is a dark patch of small spots below the eye. This species may reach a length of 1.2 m (3.9 ft), though most individuals do not exceed 1 m (3.3 ft).

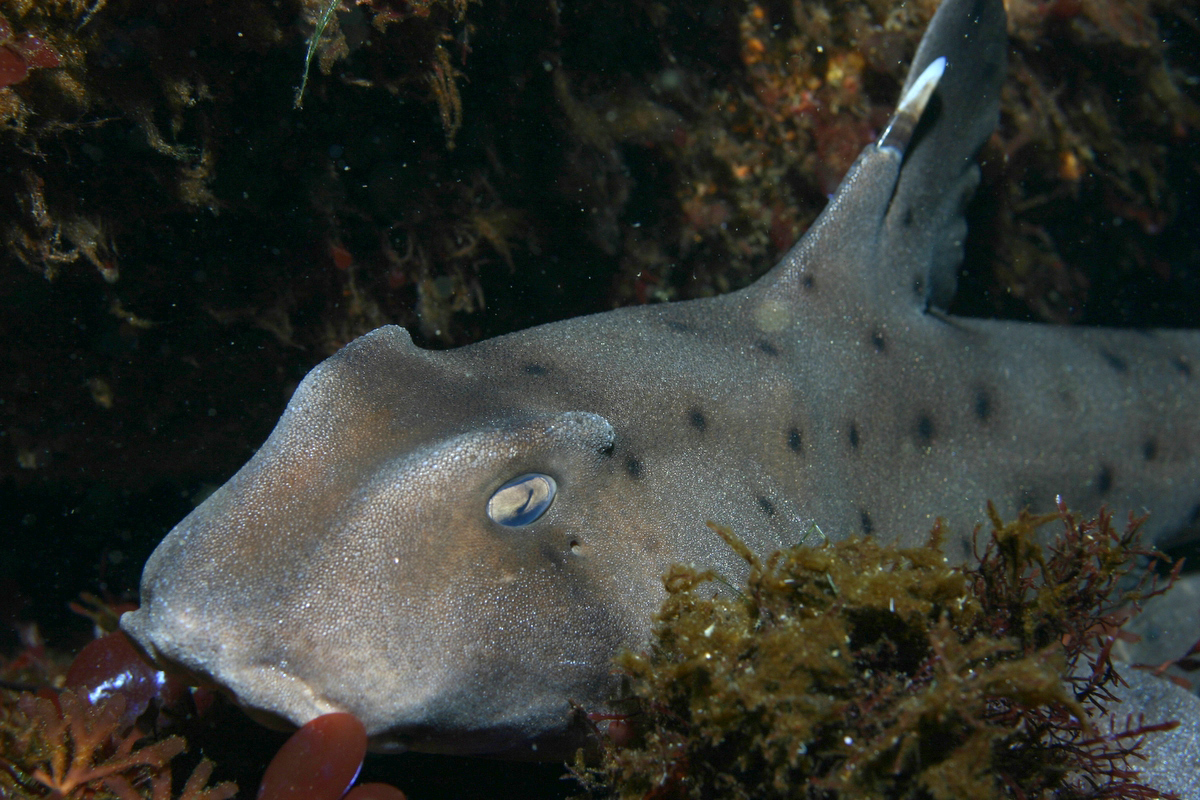
The horn shark has a distinctively shaped head with prominent ridges above its eyes.

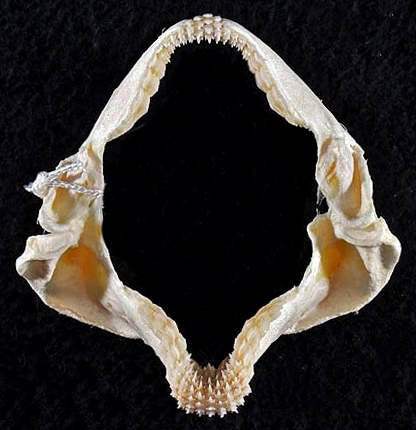
Jaws

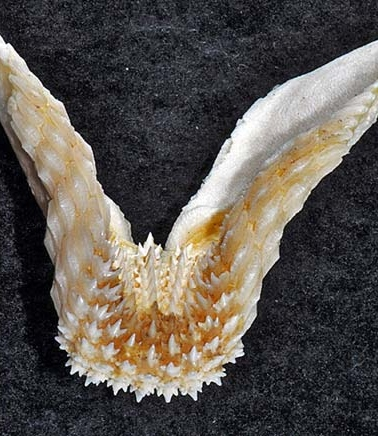
Lower teeth

== Distribution and habitat ==
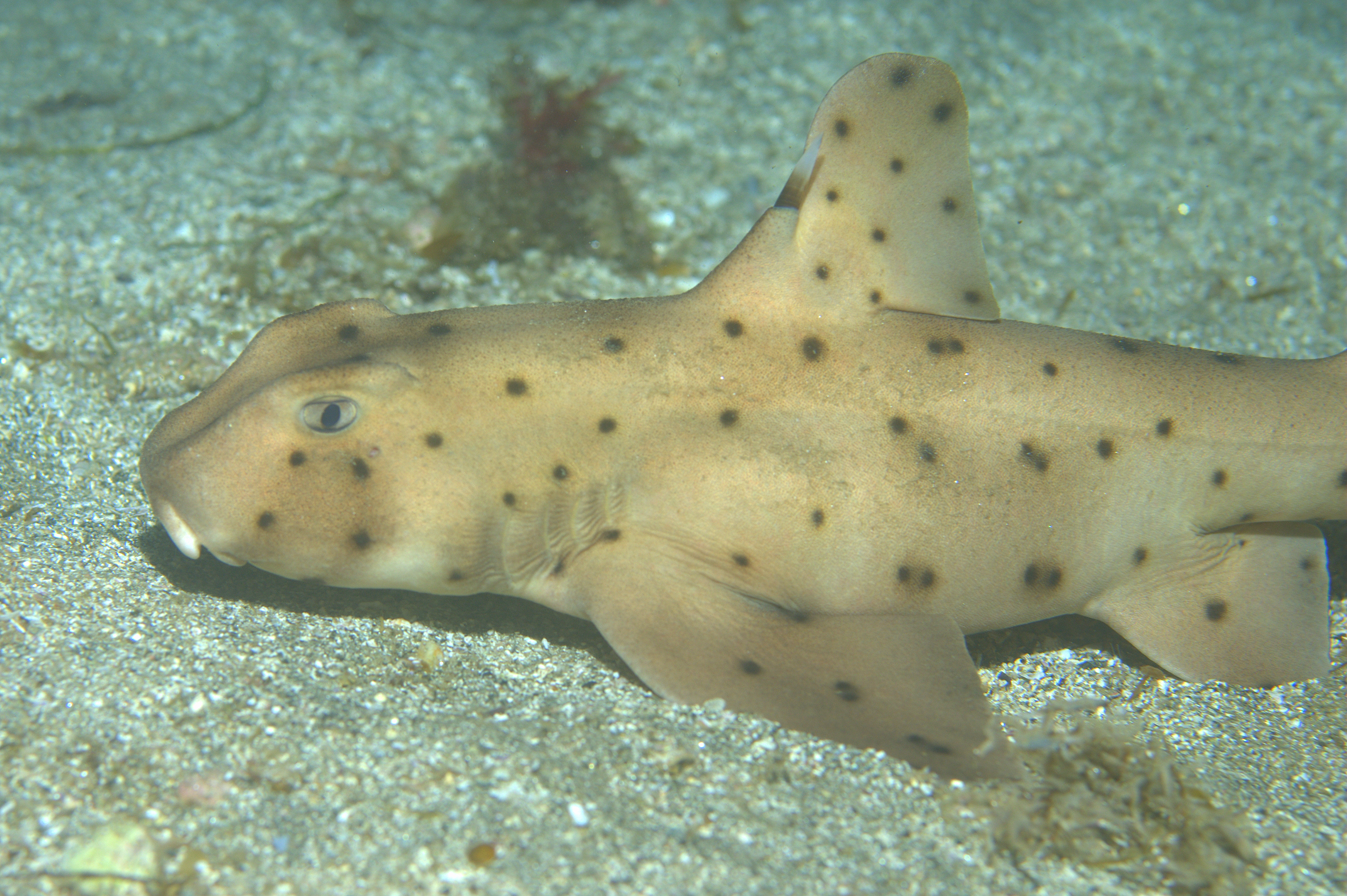
A horn shark off Santa Catalina, California

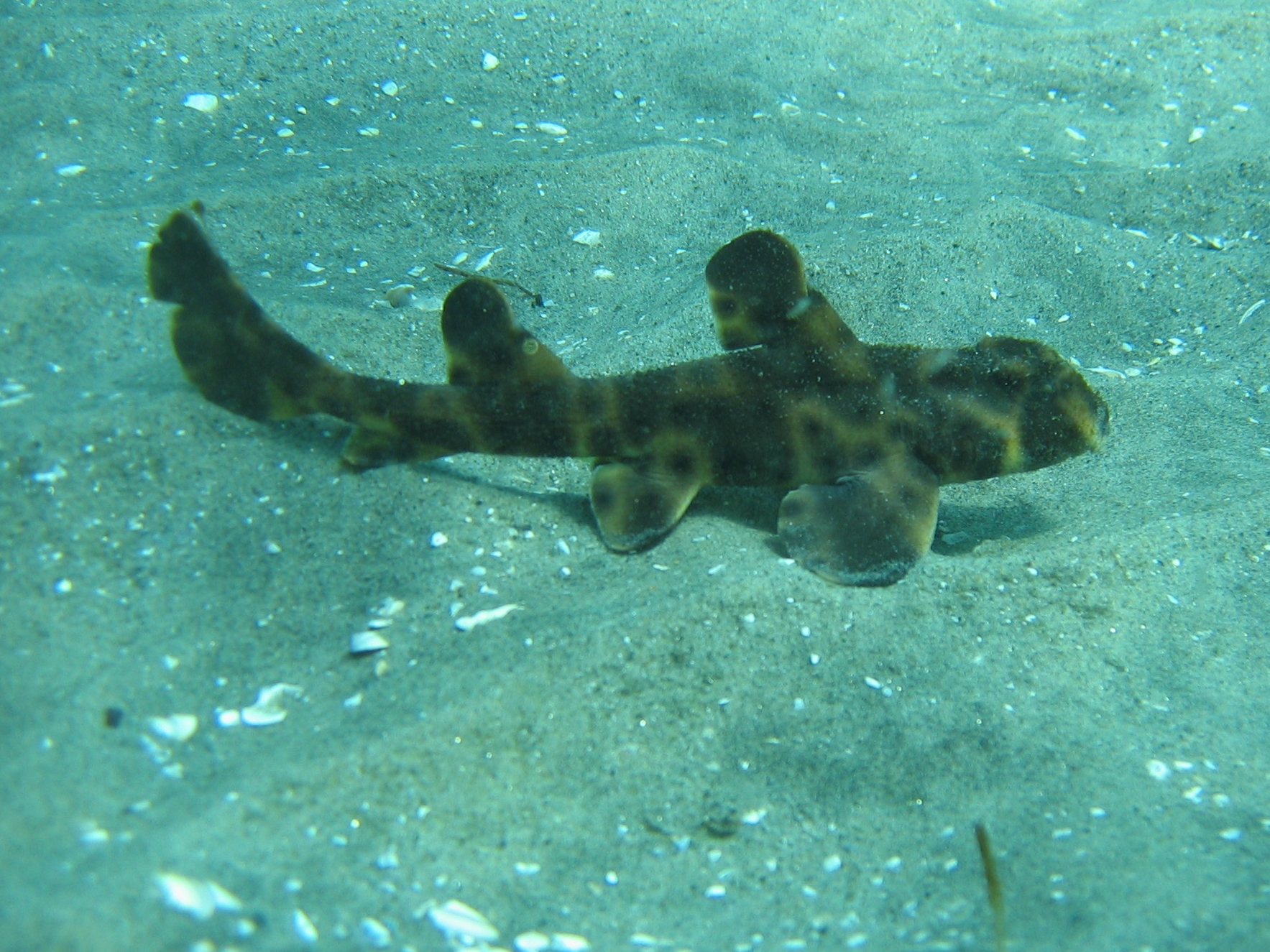
Unlike the adults, juvenile horn sharks prefer a flat, sandy habitat.

The horn shark inhabits the continental shelf of the eastern Pacific Ocean, occurring off the coasts of California and Baja California from Monterey Bay southward, and in the Gulf of California. Uncommon influxes of warm water northward may bring it as far as San Francisco Bay. There are unconfirmed reports of this species off Ecuador and Peru, which may be misidentifications of other species.

For most of the year, horn sharks are most common at a depth of 2–11 m (6.6–36.1 ft). At the onset of winter, they migrate to water deeper than 30 m (98 ft). This species has been found in caves as deep as 200 m (660 ft). Juvenile horn sharks between 35–48 cm (1.15–1.57 ft) long prefer sandy flats with low vertical relief, in water 40–150 m (130–490 ft) deep. They often take advantage of large feeding pits excavated by the bat ray (Myliobatis californica) for shelter and food. As they mature, horn sharks shift into shallower water and their preferred habitat becomes structurally complex rocky reefs or algae beds. This strongly benthic species seldom ventures more than 2 m (6.6 ft) above the substrate.

The relative abundances of the horn shark and the swell shark (Centroscyllim ventriosum), which shares the same habitat, are negatively correlated because horn sharks prefer temperatures warmer than 20 °C (68 °F) while swell sharks are more cold-tolerant. At Santa Catalina Island, a 20-year warming trend has resulted in an increase in the horn shark population and a decrease in the swell shark population. Horn sharks are less common than swell sharks in the northern Channel Islands, where the water is cooler.

== Biology and ecology ==
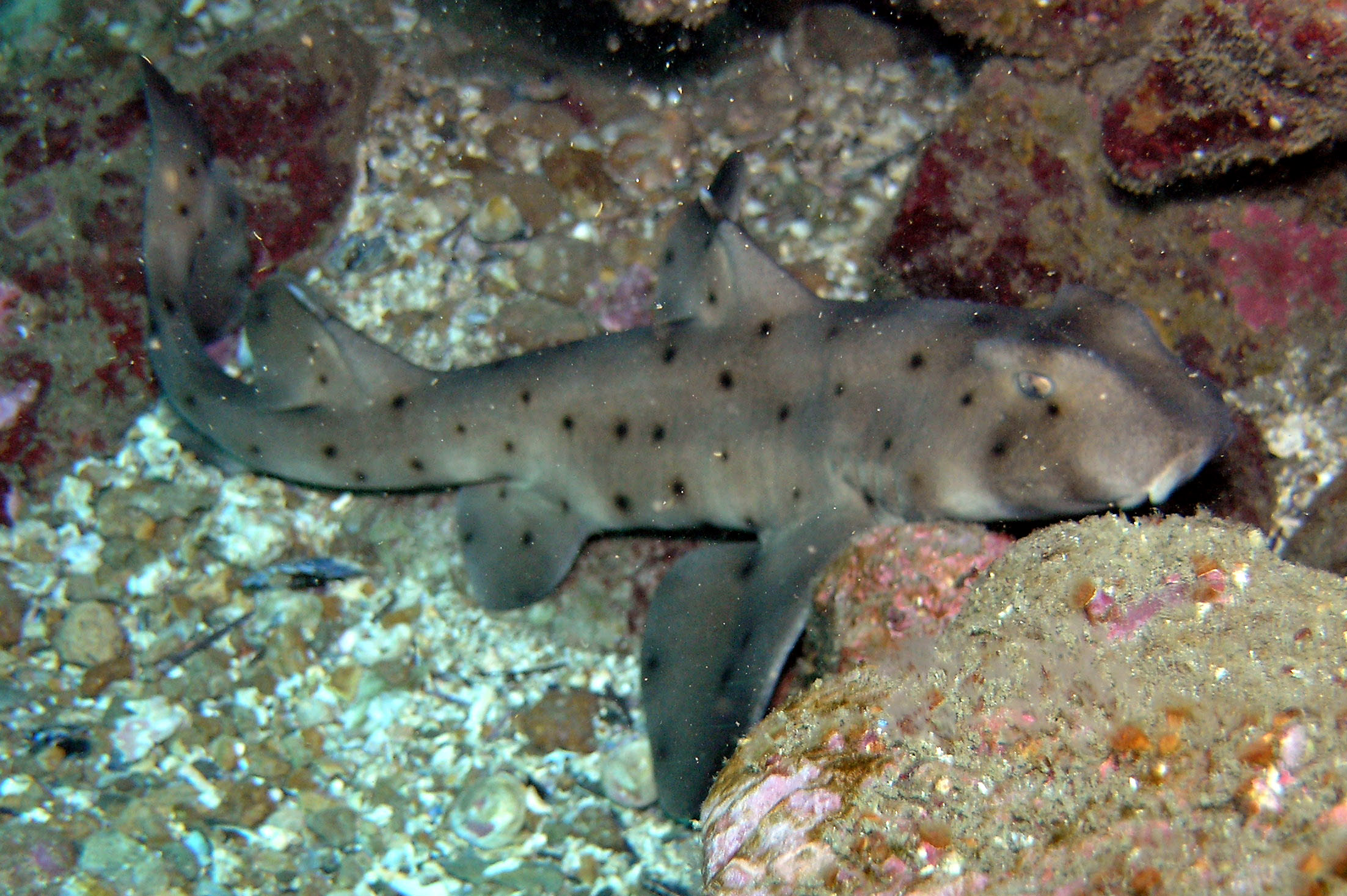
Horn sharks rest during the day and only become active at night.

The horn shark is a sporadic swimmer that prefers to use its flexible, muscular pectoral fins to push itself along the bottom. It is usually solitary, though small groups have been recorded. During the day, horn sharks rest motionless, hidden inside caves or crevices, or within thick mats of algae, though they remain relatively alert and will swim away quickly if disturbed. After dusk, they roam actively above the reef in search of food. Horn sharks maintain small home ranges of around 1,000 m^{2} (11,000 sq ft), which they may remain faithful to for over a decade, returning to the same shelter every day. The shelter is usually located at the edge of the resident shark's foraging area. The longest documented movement for an individual horn shark is 16 km (9.9 mi).

The daily activity pattern of the horn shark is under exogenous control, meaning that it is regulated by environmental factors rather than by an internal physiological cycle. Observations of captive horn sharks show that the relevant cue is light intensity: the sharks become active immediately after the lights are turned off, and stop as soon as they are turned back on. In one experiment where the sharks were kept in darkness, they remained continuously active for 11 days before slowing, possibly from fatigue. In nature, horn sharks exposed to a bright light at night may stop swimming and sink to the bottom.

The horn shark is preyed upon by larger fishes and the northern elephant seal (Mirounga angustirostris), which consumes adults, juveniles, and egg cases. In addition, they are captured and eaten by bald eagles (Haliaeetus leucocephalus) at Catalina Island, and large marine snails are able to drill into their egg cases to extract the yolk. The tough skin and spines of this species confer some protection; a Pacific angelshark (Squatina californica) has been filmed engulfing a juvenile horn shark, only to spit it out due to its spines. Known parasites of this species include the tapeworms Acanthobothrium bajaensis and Acanthobothrium puertecitense, the copepod Trebius heterodonti, and the nematode Echinocephalus pseudouncinatus, which spends its larval stage inside potential prey such as scallops and sea urchins.

=== Feeding ===
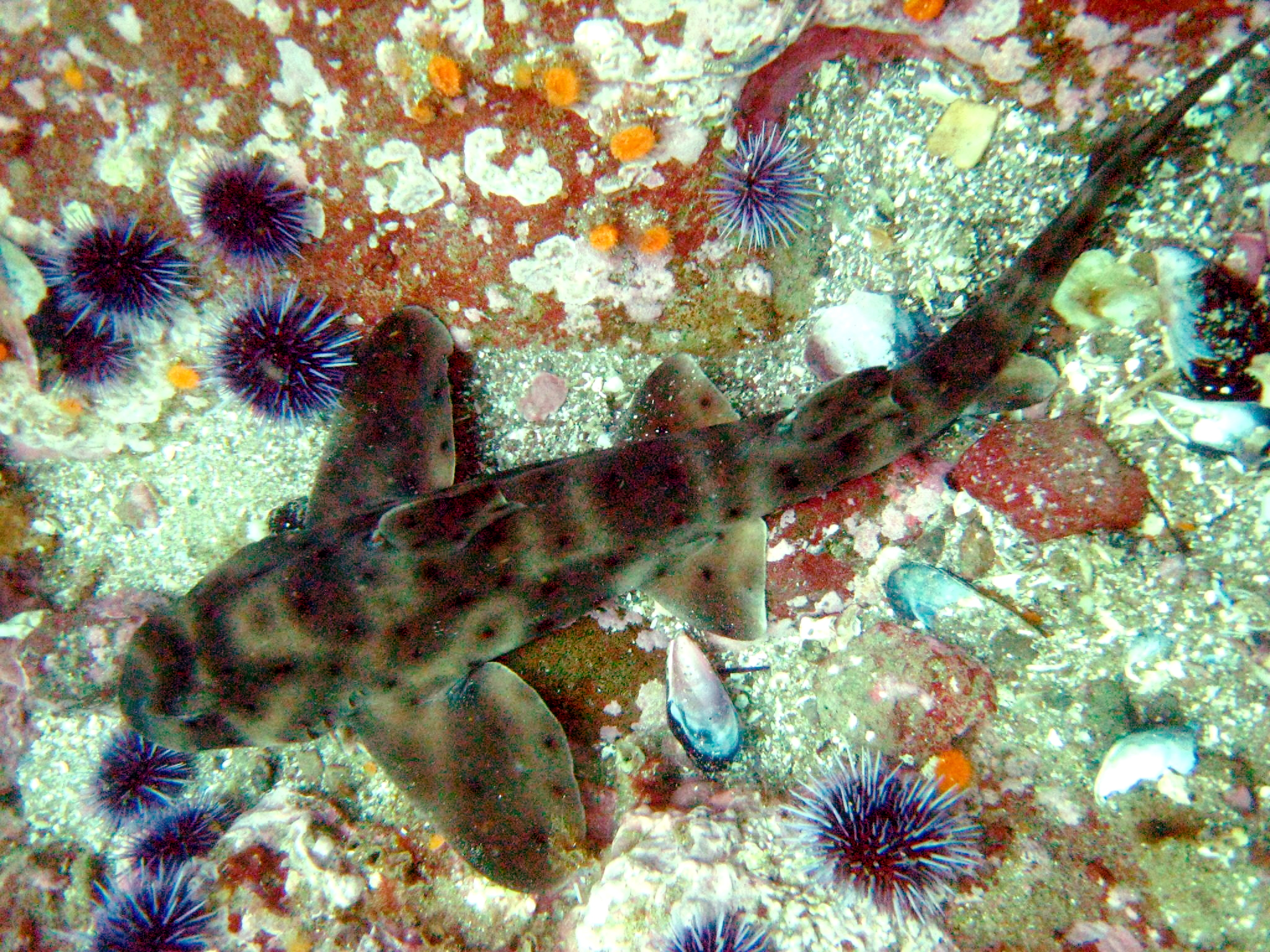
Sea urchins are a favored prey of the horn shark.

95% of the adult horn shark's diet consists of hard-shelled mollusks (e.g. bivalves and gastropods), echinoderms (e.g. sea urchins) and crustaceans (e.g. crabs, shrimp, and isopods). To crack their shells, the horn shark generates the highest known bite force relative to its size of any shark, well in excess of other measured species such as the spiny dogfish (Squalus acanthias) and the blacktip shark (Carcharhinus limbatus). One study found the average bite force for this species in the wild to be 95 N with a maximum of 135 N, while under experimental conditions sharks could be induced to bite with over 200 N of force. Large horn sharks that feed mainly on sea urchins (particularly the short-spined purple urchin, Strongylocentrotus purpuratus) have their teeth and fin spines stained purple.

Other prey items of adults include peanut worms, sea stars, cephalopods, and small bony fishes. Juveniles feed primarily on polychaete worms, sea anemones, and small clams, and have been known to "pounce" on anemones to bite off tentacles before they can be retracted. Off southern California, horn sharks are known to take advantage of seasonal opportunities. In the summer, diurnally active fishes, in particular the blacksmith (Chromis punctipinnis), are especially abundant and are easily captured at night when they lie dormant. In the winter, the sharks scavenge on market squid (Loligo opalescens), which die by the tens of thousands after their mass spawning event. Horn sharks hunt mainly using their sense of smell. Although electroreception certainly plays a role in locating prey, this species has only 148 ampullae of Lorenzini. This is much fewer than in most other sharks, which may have over 2,000. Like other sharks, the horn shark's teeth are regularly replaced; it takes 4 weeks for a dropped tooth to be replaced.

The horn shark captures prey via suction, created by expanding its buccal cavity. Its labial cartilages are modified so that the mouth can form a tube, facilitating the suction force. Once the prey is drawn into the mouth, it is secured with the sharp front teeth and then ground into pieces by the flat lateral teeth. To extract buried or affixed prey, the horn shark grips it and adopts a vertical posture with the head and pectoral fins against the substrate and the tail arched above. The shark then acts as a lever with its pectoral fins as the fulcrum: with a downward stroke of the tail, it forces its head upwards and pulls the prey loose; this mode of feeding has not been observed in any other shark. The horn shark is also capable of protruding its upper jaw up to 15% the length of its head; this motion takes only 20 milliseconds to accomplish and allows the shark to use its upper jaw like a chisel to dislodge firmly attached prey.

=== Life history ===
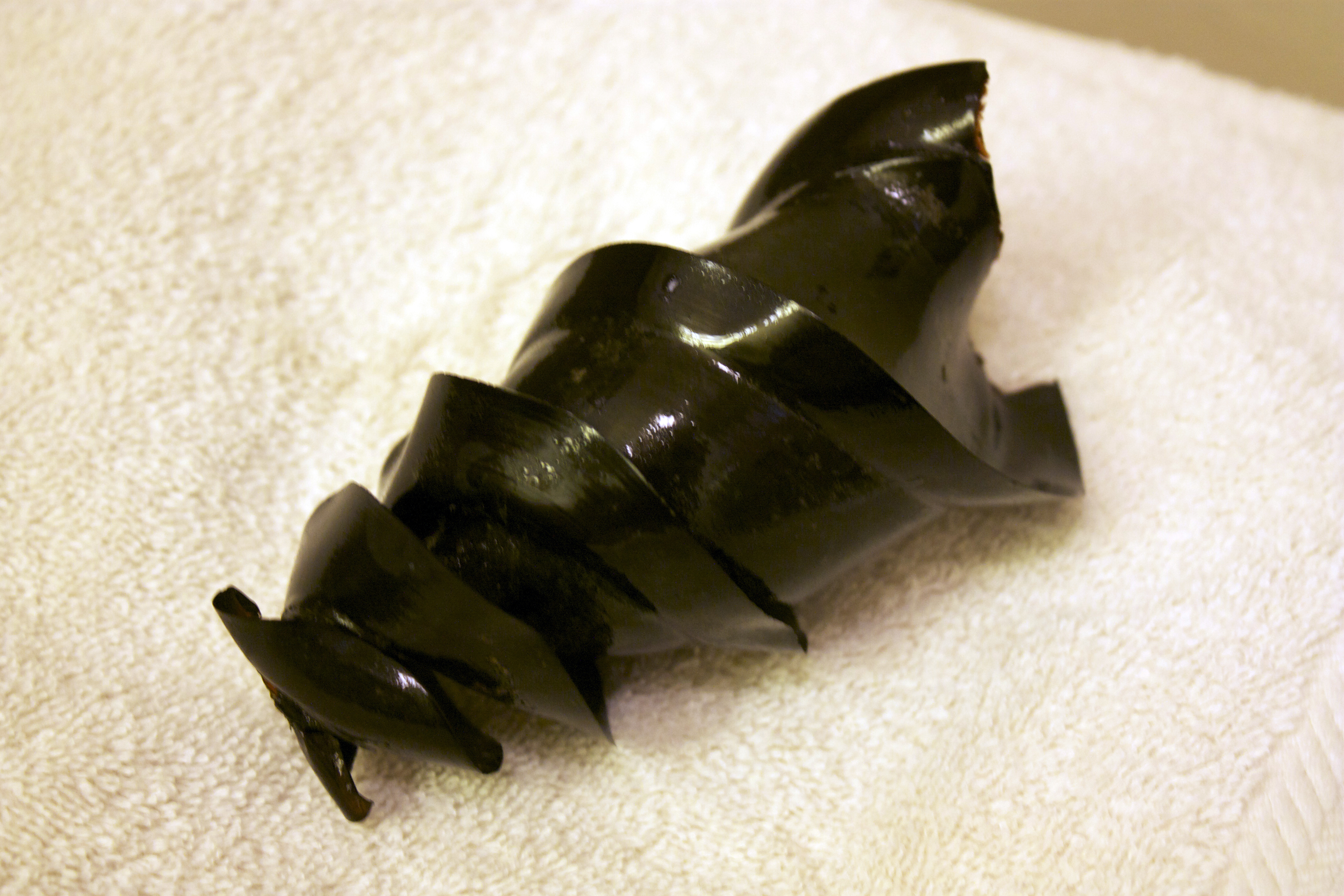
The spiral-flanged egg case of a horn shark; the shape allows the egg to be secured within crevices.

Mating in the horn shark occurs in December or January, on a possibly annual reproductive cycle. The male chases the female to indicate interest; once she is ready both sharks settle on the bottom, where the male grips the female's pectoral fin in his teeth and inserts one of his claspers into her cloaca. After 30–40 minutes of copulation, the pair disengages and the female spins with her snout in the sand for another 30 minutes. From February to April, the females lay a maximum of 24 eggs two at a time once every 11–14 days, in water 2–13 m (6.6–42.7 ft) deep. The egg case has two flanges spiraling around it, and thus may take the female several hours to deposit. At first the case is soft and light brown, and over a few days it hardens and darkens in color. Not including the flanges, the case measures 10–12 cm (3.9–4.7 in) long and 3–4 cm (1.2–1.6 in) wide; sharks from the Channel Islands produce longer egg cases than those from mainland California, suggesting that they are separate populations.

One of the few sharks to exhibit parental care, female horn sharks in the wild pick up their eggs in their mouths and wedge them into crevices. However, in captivity the eggs are simply dropped on the bottom and may later be cannibalized. The eggs hatch in 6–10 months; at emergence the young measure 15–17 cm (5.9–6.7 in) long. Newly hatched sharks are provisioned with an internal yolk sac and do not have to feed until they are a month old, though they are capable of feeding and will accept food during this period. Horn sharks grow slowly and at a highly variable rate that does not correspond to their size; this has frustrated attempts to determine their aging process. Males mature at a length of 56–61 cm (22–24 in) and females at a length of at least 58 cm (23 in). Individual sharks have lived to over 12 years old in captivity, and there exists an unconfirmed report of a shark reaching 25 years of age.

== Human interactions ==
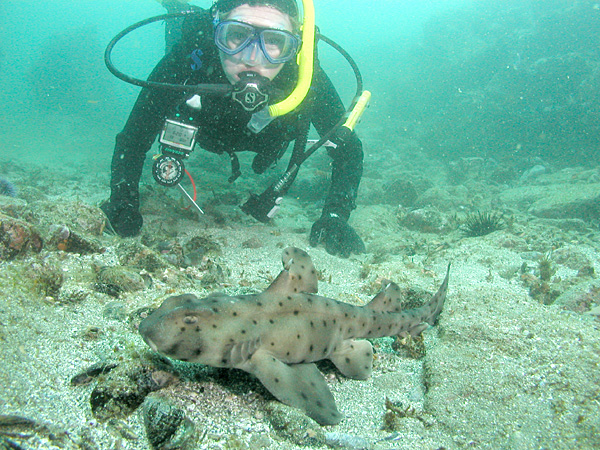
Horn sharks are innocuous towards humans.

Under normal circumstances, horn sharks are harmless to humans and can readily be approached underwater. However, they can be provoked into biting, and some pugnacious individuals have been known to chase and bite divers after being harassed. These sharks should be handled with care as their fin spines can inflict a painful wound. The horn shark adapts well to captivity and has been maintained and bred in many public aquariums across the United States. In July 2018, three people were arrested after stealing a juvenile horn shark from the San Antonio Aquarium. The shark was smuggled out of the aquarium in a stroller under a blanket. It was returned unharmed two days later.

The horn shark has no commercial value in California, where it is captured unintentionally in traps and trawls and by recreational anglers. The shark's hardiness ensures that it can often be returned to the water alive. This species benefits from general restrictions placed on coastal fishing gear by the State of California. The average annual bycatch off California is 1,800 kg (4,000 lb), though historically it has varied from 2.5 kg (5.5 lb) in 1976 to 9,500 kg (20,900 lb) in 1979. Divers sometimes kill them for sport or to make jewelry out of their fin spines, which may be the cause of a decline in the numbers of horn sharks in the most intensely dived areas of southern California. Off Mexico, this species is caught incidentally in shrimp trawls and demersal gillnets, and used for human consumption and fishmeal. The expansion of Mexican gillnet fisheries may pose a conservation concern in the future. At present, the International Union for Conservation of Nature (IUCN) does not have sufficient information to assess the overall conservation status of this species; its status in United States waters is likely Least Concern.
