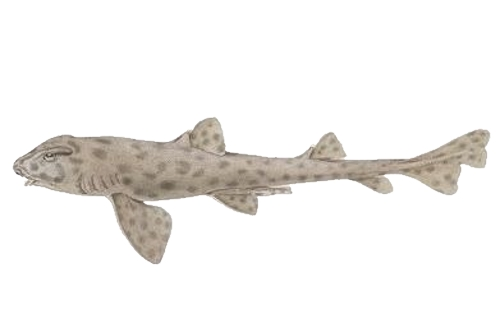

Conservation status
- Least Concern (IUCN 3.1)

Scientific classification
- Kingdom: Animalia
- Phylum: Chordata
- Class: Chondrichthyes
- Subclass: Elasmobranchii
- Division: Selachii
- Order: Heterodontiformes
- Family: Heterodontidae
- Genus: Heterodontus
- Species: H. quoyi

Binomial name
- Heterodontus quoyi (Fréminville, 1840)
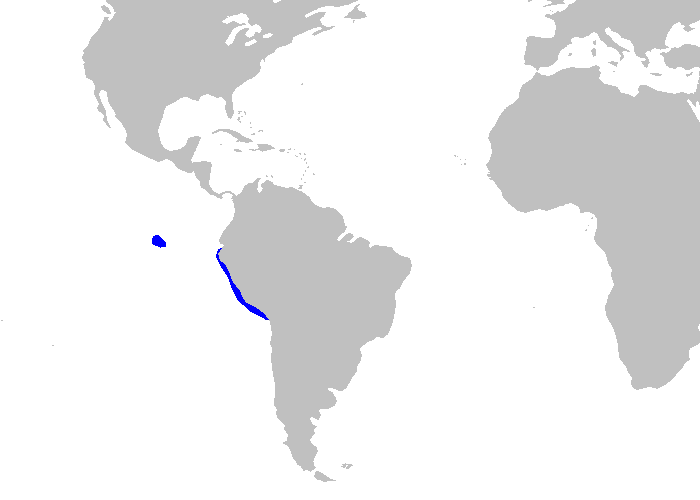
- Range of Galapagos bullhead shark (in blue)

= Galapagos bullhead shark =

Species of shark

The Galapagos bullhead shark, Heterodontus quoyi, is a bullhead shark of the family Heterodontidae found in the tropical eastern Pacific Ocean between latitudes 0° to 10°S, at depths between 3 and 40 m. It can reach a length of 1.07 m.

The reproduction of this bullhead shark is oviparous.
