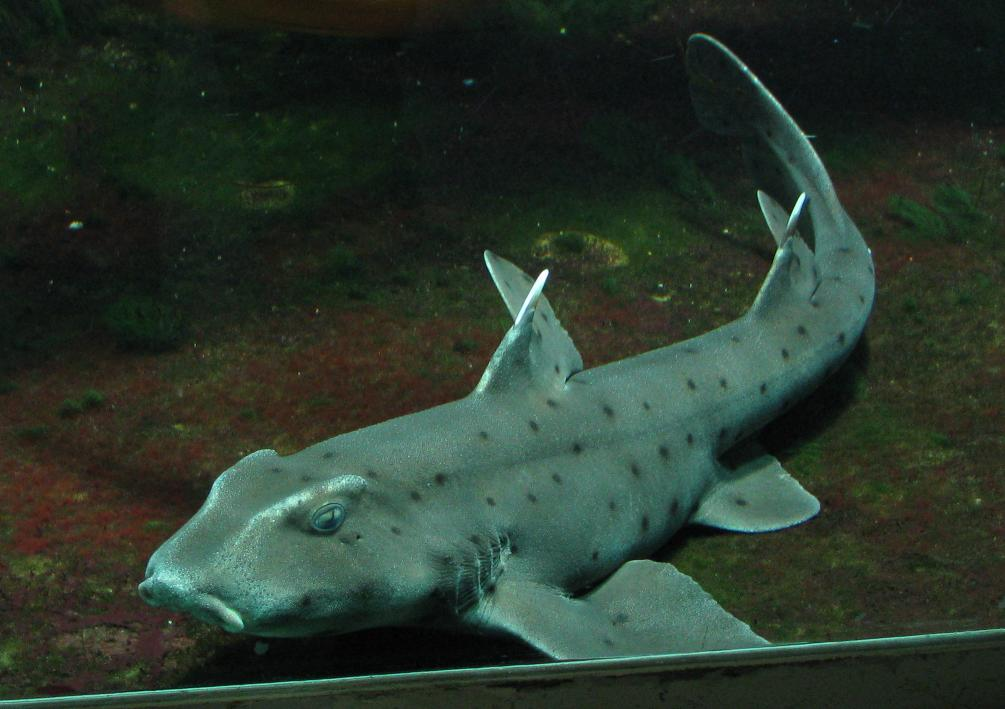
- Horn shark, Heterodontus francisci

Scientific classification
- Kingdom: Animalia
- Phylum: Chordata
- Class: Chondrichthyes
- Subclass: Elasmobranchii
- Division: Selachii
- Superorder: Galeomorphi
- Order: Heterodontiformes
- Family: Heterodontidae; J. E. Gray, 1851
- Genus: Heterodontus; Blainville, 1816

Type species
- Squalus portusjacksoni F. A. A. Meyer, 1793

Species
- See text

= Bullhead shark =

Bullhead shark Temporal range: Late Jurassic–Present

Genus of sharks

The bullhead sharks are members of the genus Heterodontus, the only members of the family Heterodontidae and only living members of the order Heterodontiformes. All are relatively small, with the largest species reaching just 1.65 metres (5.5 ft) in maximum length. They are bottom feeders in tropical and subtropical waters.

The Heterodontiforms appear in the fossil record in the Early Jurassic. The oldest fossils of the modern genus date to the Late Jurassic. Despite the very ancient origins of this genus and its abundance in the fossil record, phylogenetic evidence indicates that all extant species in the genus arose from a single common ancestor that survived the Cretaceous-Paleogene extinction, with diversification into modern species only starting around the mid-Eocene.

== Description ==
Bullhead sharks have tapered bodies, with most species reaching around 70–130 centimetres (2.3–4.3 ft) in length. Their bodies vary in colour, including shades of grey, brown, and red and pale colours, and are covered in a variety of patterns, including spots and stripes. They have blunt, proportionally large heads with relatively small mouths and large nostrils, with pronounced ridges above their eyes. They have two dorsal fins, both substantial in size, the first larger than the second, each of which has a rigid fin spine at the front, along with an anal fin. The tail fin is also large, with upper and lower lobes separated by a notch. Bullhead sharks have differentiated teeth, with cusped grasping teeth at the front of the mouth, and flattened teeth at the back of the mouth. Their egg cases have a spiral colarettes running along their length.

== Ecology ==
Bullhead sharks live in coastal littoral environments, generally shallower than 100 metres (330 ft), and are usually primarily active at night. Bullhead sharks ingest prey via suction feeding. They feed on invertebrate prey, including both hard prey such as crustaceans and sea urchins, and soft bodied prey such as octopuses, as well as predating on fish. They use their flattened teeth at the back of the mouth to crush hard-shelled prey and fish. Juveniles generally take softer prey than adults. The sharp fin spines provide a deterrent to being consumed by predators.

Bullhead shark egg cases are shaped like an auger, with two spiral flanges. This allows the egg cases to become wedged in the crevices of rocky sea floors, where the eggs are protected from predators; however, some bullhead sharks deposit their eggs on sponges or seaweed. Hatchlings are considered large for sharks, reaching over 14 cm in length by the time they leave the egg case. Bullhead shark eggs typically hatch after 7 to 12 months, depending on the species. The female Japanese bullhead shark has been known to deposit their eggs in one location along with other females, called a "nest". The egg case of the Mexican hornshark features a tendril and more rigid flanges, suggesting that egg case design of this species primarily involves anchoring with tendrils rather than wedging into crevices. The Oman bullhead shark was the most recently described species within the Heterodontus genus until 2023 when the Painted hornshark was described.

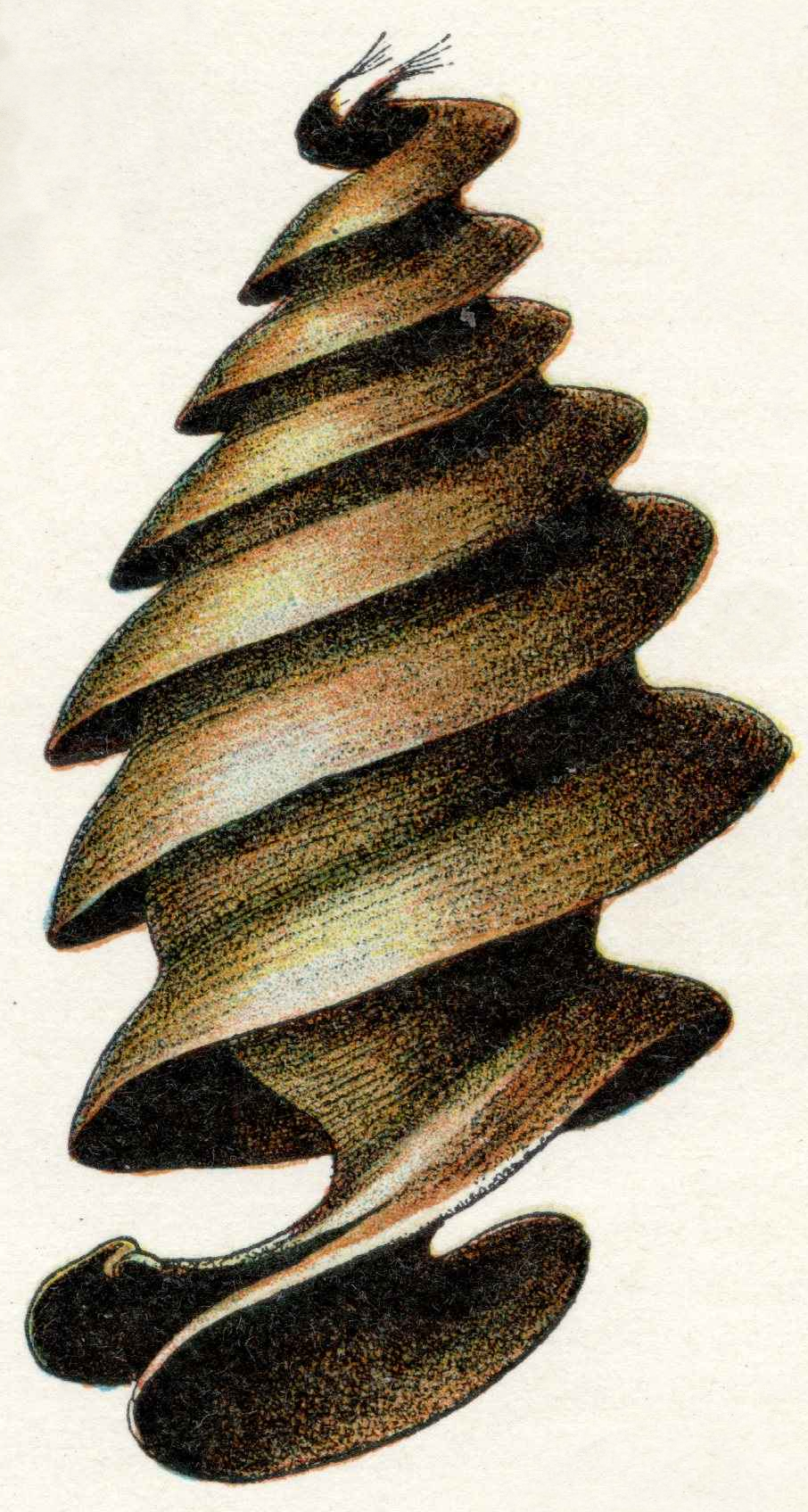
Bullhead shark egg case

== Species ==
Ten living species of bullhead shark have been described:

- Heterodontus francisci (Girard, 1855) (horn shark)
- Heterodontus galeatus (Günther, 1870) (crested bullhead shark)
- Heterodontus japonicus (Maclay & W. J. Macleay, 1884) (Japanese bullhead shark)
- Heterodontus marshallae White, Mollen, O'Neill, Yang & Naylor, 2023 (painted hornshark)
- Heterodontus mexicanus (L. R. Taylor & Castro-Aguirre, 1972) (Mexican hornshark)
- Heterodontus omanensis (Z. H. Baldwin, 2005) (Oman bullhead shark)
- Heterodontus portusjacksoni (F. A. A. Meyer, 1793) (Port Jackson shark)
- Heterodontus quoyi (Fréminville, 1840) (Galapagos bullhead shark)
- Heterodontus ramalheira (J. L. B. Smith, 1949) (whitespotted bullhead shark)
- Heterodontus zebra (J. E. Gray, 1831) (zebra bullhead shark)
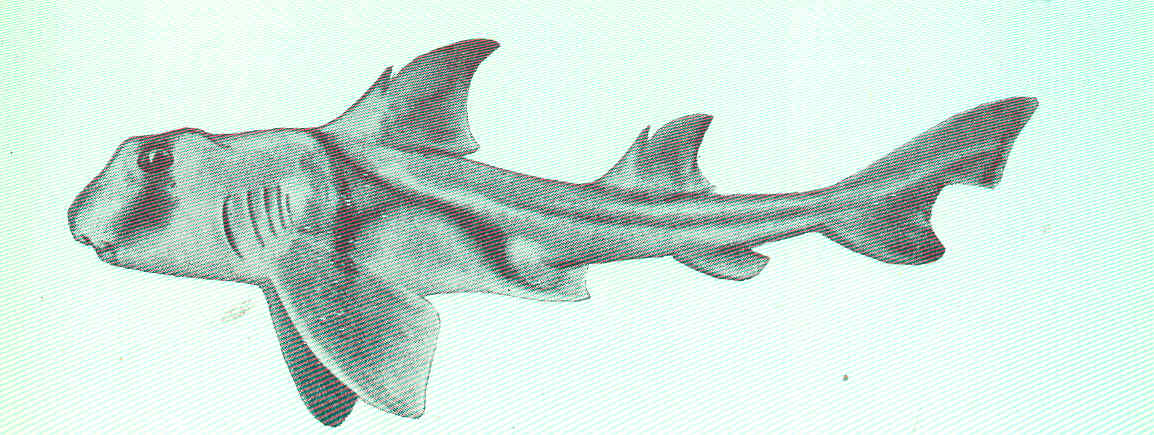
A Port Jackson shark, Heterodontus portusjacksoni

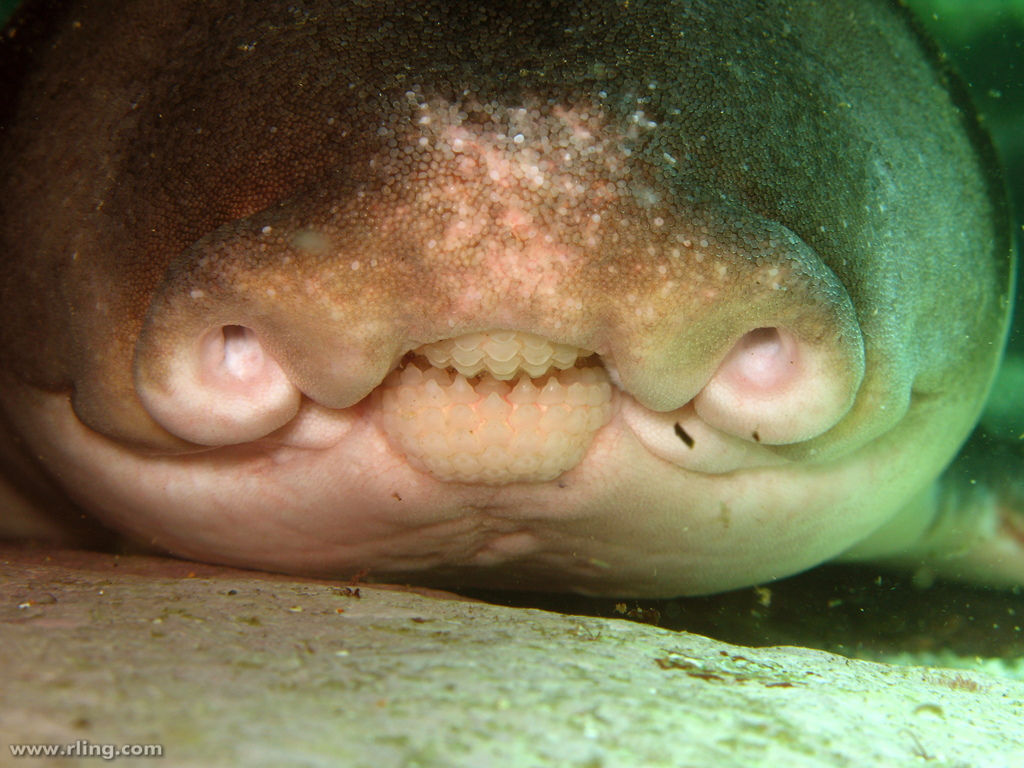
Dentition and oronasal grooves of a Port Jackson shark

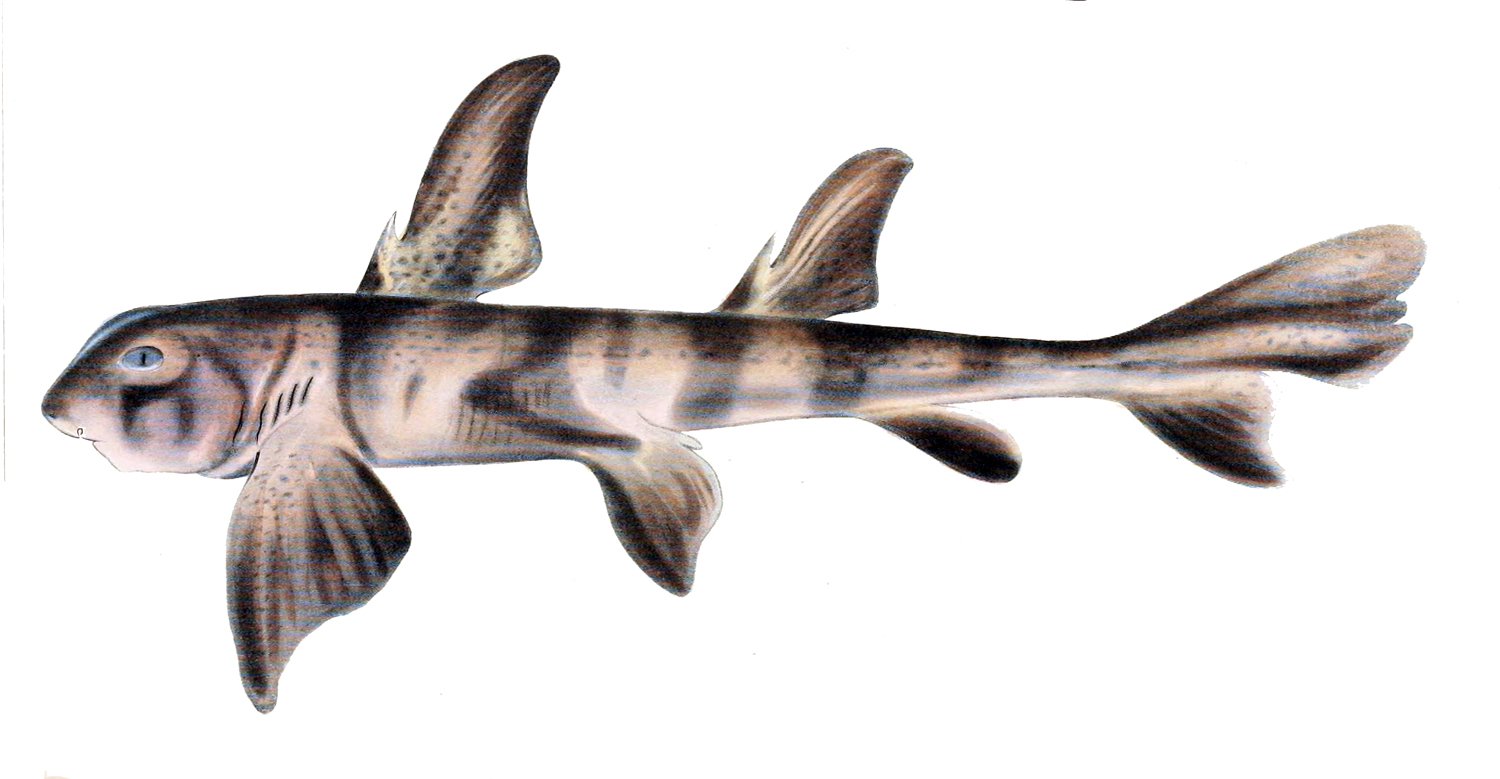
Zebra bullhead shark, Heterodontus zebra

== See also ==
- List of prehistoric cartilaginous fish
