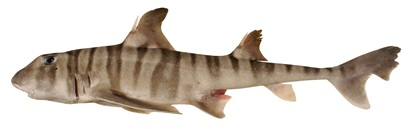

Conservation status
- Least Concern (IUCN 3.1)

Scientific classification
- Kingdom: Animalia
- Phylum: Chordata
- Class: Chondrichthyes
- Subclass: Elasmobranchii
- Division: Selachii
- Order: Heterodontiformes
- Family: Heterodontidae
- Genus: Heterodontus
- Species: H. zebra

Binomial name
- Heterodontus zebra (J. E. Gray, 1831)
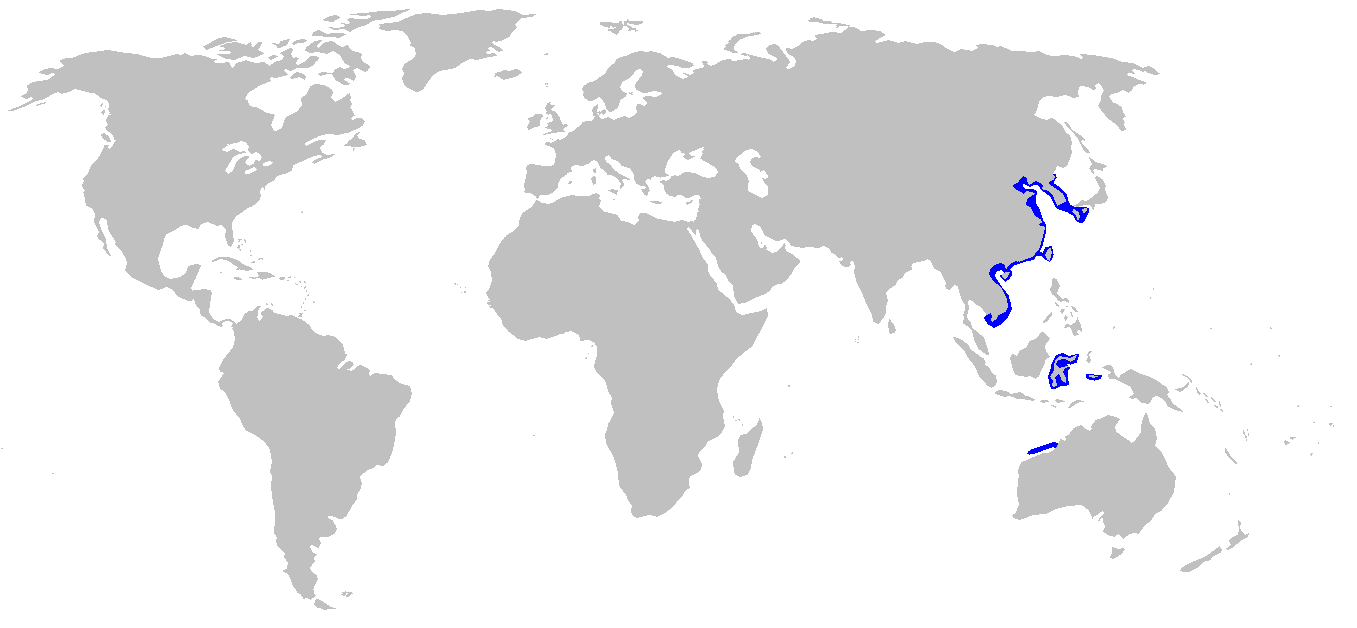
- Range of zebra bullhead shark (in blue)

= Zebra bullhead shark =

Species of shark

The zebra bullhead shark (Heterodontus zebra) is a bullhead shark of the family Heterodontidae found in the central Indo-Pacific between latitudes 40°N and 20°S, from Japan and Korea to Australia. It is typically found at relatively shallow depths down to 50 m (160 ft), but off Western Australia, it occurs between 150 and 200 m (490 and 660 ft). It can reach a length of 1.25 m (4.1 ft). The reproduction of this bullhead shark is oviparous.

== Description ==
The zebra bullhead shark is a member of the bullhead and horn shark family, the Heterodontidae. This organism is occasionally been referred to as the zebra horn shark, striped bullhead shark, and the zebra Port Jackson shark. These sharks receive their name due to their bull-like appearance because of the heavy brown bones present over each eye. The taxon of the zebra bullhead shark is small but has had a fossil record that has been traced back closely to the beginning of the Mesozoic era. This species was classified first in the genus Squalus which is also known as the Linnaean shark. The Linnaean shark is known to be a bottom dwelling shark which is similar to the Bullhead shark family.

The zebra bullhead shark is of minimal interest to commercial fisheries and game fishing. However, due to the unique and attractive color pattern of these sharks they are a part of the aquarium trade around the world. These organisms are known to be carnivores and feed on a range of organisms including sea urchins and crustaceans. The prey they feed on can be found in rocky reefs and kelp forests where zebra bullhead sharks live. The range of these organisms within the marine habitat is from 50 meters to 200 meters. Zebra bullhead sharks are known to not have many natural predators where they live. However, in rare cases, larger sharks and human can be a threat to these organisms.

== Appearance ==
The zebra bullhead shark's body shape is slim, oval shaped, and ray-like. The snouts on these sharks is short and rounded without the presence of lateral teeth. The eyes are dorsolateral on the head with crests above the eyes. The appearance of the Heterodontus zebra from an external view involves the presence of a dorsal fin and anal fin. The dorsal fin on these sharks has a spine within it. The length of the dorsal fin is about 21 to 27% of the total organisms length. The first dorsal fin is high in the juvenile sharks, while in the adult sharks the first dorsal fin is moderately high. The color of the dorsal surface is a range between white and cream depending on the shark. There are five large gill openings slightly in front of pectoral-fin mid-bases on the side of these sharks heads. Out of the five gill slits, the first gill slit is the largest and is closest to the front of the body. The smallest gill slit is the most posterior out of the five gill slits. Along with this, these organisms have a range of large to small vertical markings from the snout to the caudal fin of brown and black color. Depending on size, Heterodontus zebra between 64 and 122 cm has about 22 to 36 brown or black markings. The fins on this organism typically have black tips or white dorsal-fin apices.

== Size ==
The maximum total length of the Heterodontus zebra is 122 cm which is roughly four feet. The hatchlings of this species are at least 15 cm at birth. Males mature between 64 and 84 cm, while females mature at 122 cm.

== Life history ==
The zebra bullhead shark's reproduction system is oviparous. Oviparous reproduction is the process of producing organisms by the hatching or laying eggs by a parent. A female shark lays two eggs at a time during the spring to the later summer near the coast of Japan. The typical seasonal spawning pattern of the female shark is six to twelve times during a single mating season. The eggs are normally laid in rocks or fields of kelp. When eggs are hatched, the embryos feed on the yolk and hatch a year after they have been produced. The typical size of these hatchlings is 18 cm. The process of reproduction begins with a male grasping the pectoral fin of a female. The male inserts a single clasper into a female's cloaca.

== Human impact ==
The zebra bullhead sharks are characterized by slow growth which makes it difficult to cultivate them in the laboratory. Due to the slow growth and reproductivity that characterize these organisms human can have an impact. These organisms are important to humans in various ways including the aquarium trade, the study of marine ecology, and the impact these organisms have on other species. Conservation efforts have been put in place to limit the impact of humans on the zebra bullhead sharks. Laws have been put in place on the coasts of Asia in order to protect this species and its closest relatives. Although the zebra bullhead shark is classified as Least Concern on the IUCN's Red list there is little information provided to fully understand the impact humans are having on these organisms.
