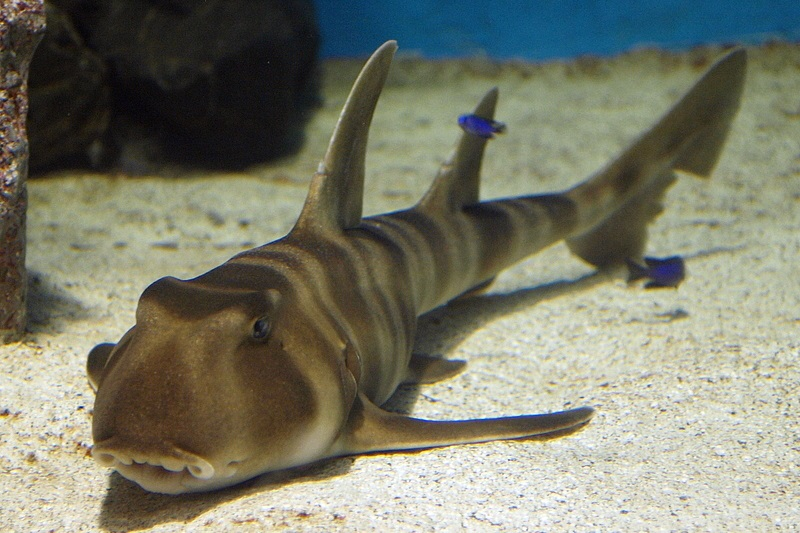
- Heterodontus japonicus
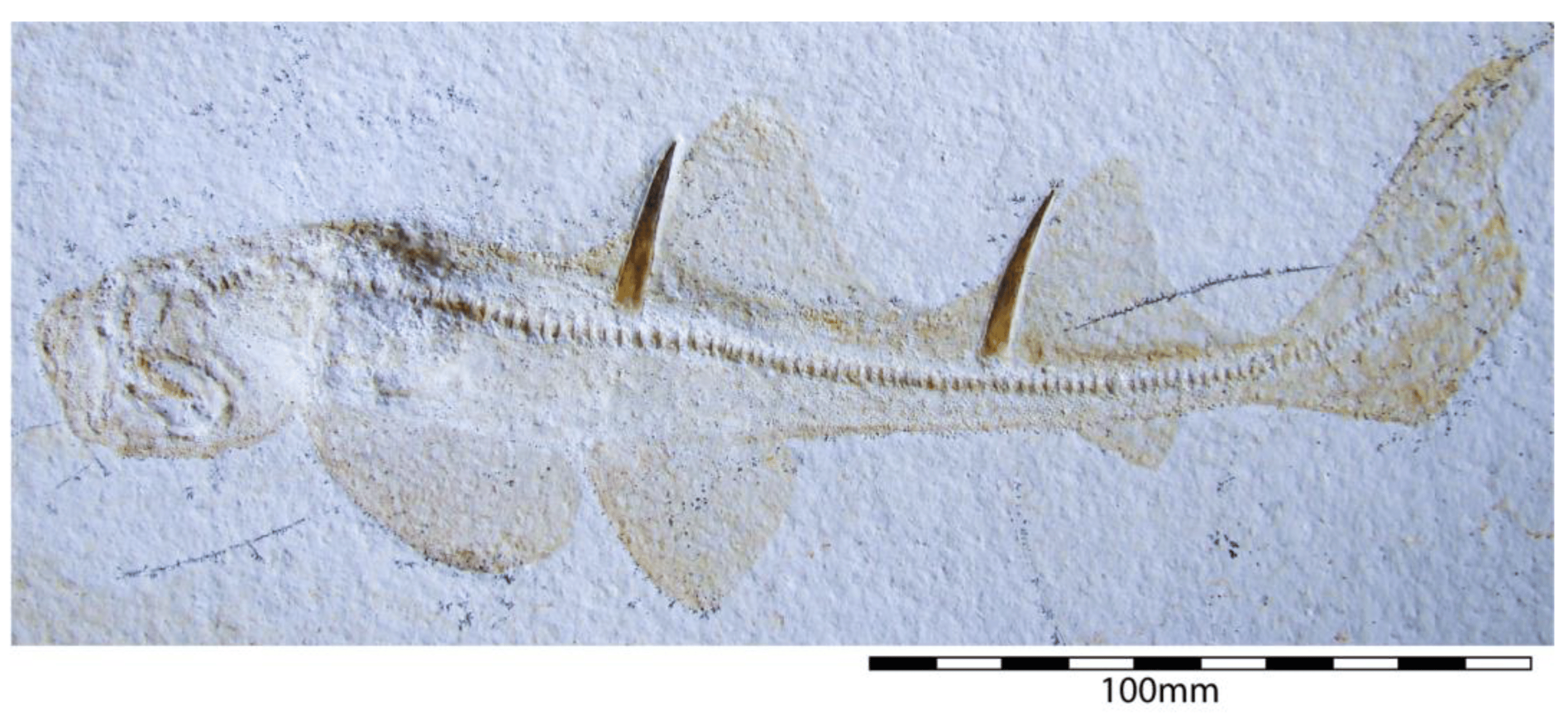
- Paracestracion danieli

Scientific classification
- Kingdom: Animalia
- Phylum: Chordata
- Class: Chondrichthyes
- Subclass: Elasmobranchii
- Division: Selachii
- Superorder: Galeomorphi
- Order: Heterodontiformes; L. S. Berg, 1940

Genera
- †Proheterodontus; †Palaeoheterodontus; †Procestracion; †Protoheterodontus; †Paracestracionidae; †Paracestracion; Heterodontidae; Heterodontus

= Heterodontiformes =

Heterodontiformes Temporal range: Toarcian–Recent

Order of sharks

Heterodontiformes is an order of sharks in the superorder Galeomorphi. It includes the bullhead sharks (genus Heterodontus), and several extinct genera. The earliest known members of the group are from the Early Jurassic (Toarcian), around 175 million years ago. Several extinct genera are known from the Jurassic, with all except Paracestracion only known from isolated teeth. The teeth of heterodontiforms exhibit differentation, with the front teeth having well developed cusps to grasp prey, while the back teeth are flattened, and serve to crush hard shelled prey. They inhabit shallow littoral environments. Paracestracion exhibits notable anatomical differences from Heterodontus and is placed in its own family, Paracestracionidae within the order. The oldest known members of Heterodontus appeared during the Late Jurassic.
