= Raja mauritaniensis =

Scientific classification
- Kingdom: Animalia
- Phylum: Chordata
- Class: Chondrichthyes
- Subclass: Elasmobranchii
- Order: Rajiformes
- Family: Rajidae
- Genus: Raja
- Species: R. mauritaniensis

Binomial name
- Raja mauritaniensis White & Fricke, 2021

Synonyms
- Raja africana Capapé, 1977; Raja maderensis (non Lowe, 1838)

Species of cartilaginous fish

Raja mauritaniensis, commonly known as the African ray, is a species of ray in the family Rajidae. It is found at depths of 50–400 m (160–1,310 ft) in the eastern Atlantic Ocean off Mauritania and Tunisia.

This species was described in 1977, but the currently used scientific name is a homonym, preoccupied by Raja africana Bloch & Schneider, 1801, which is a synonym of Urogymnus asperrimus. Consequently, a replacement scientific name is needed for the African ray. Furthermore, the validity of the African ray has been questioned, with some suggesting that its type specimen may be an aberrant R. miraletus or R. straeleni.
