= Thornback =

Thornback may refer to:

== Fish ==
- Thornback guitarfish (Platyrhinoidis triseriata), a species of ray in the north-eastern Pacific Ocean
- Thornback ray (Raja clavata), also known as the Thorback skate, a species of ray in the Atlantic Ocean
- Thornback skate (Dentiraja lemprieri), a fish endemic to Australia

== Other ==
- USS Thornback (SS-418), a submarine
- Phaerimm, a fictional species of creatures in Dungeons & Dragons
- Spinster
