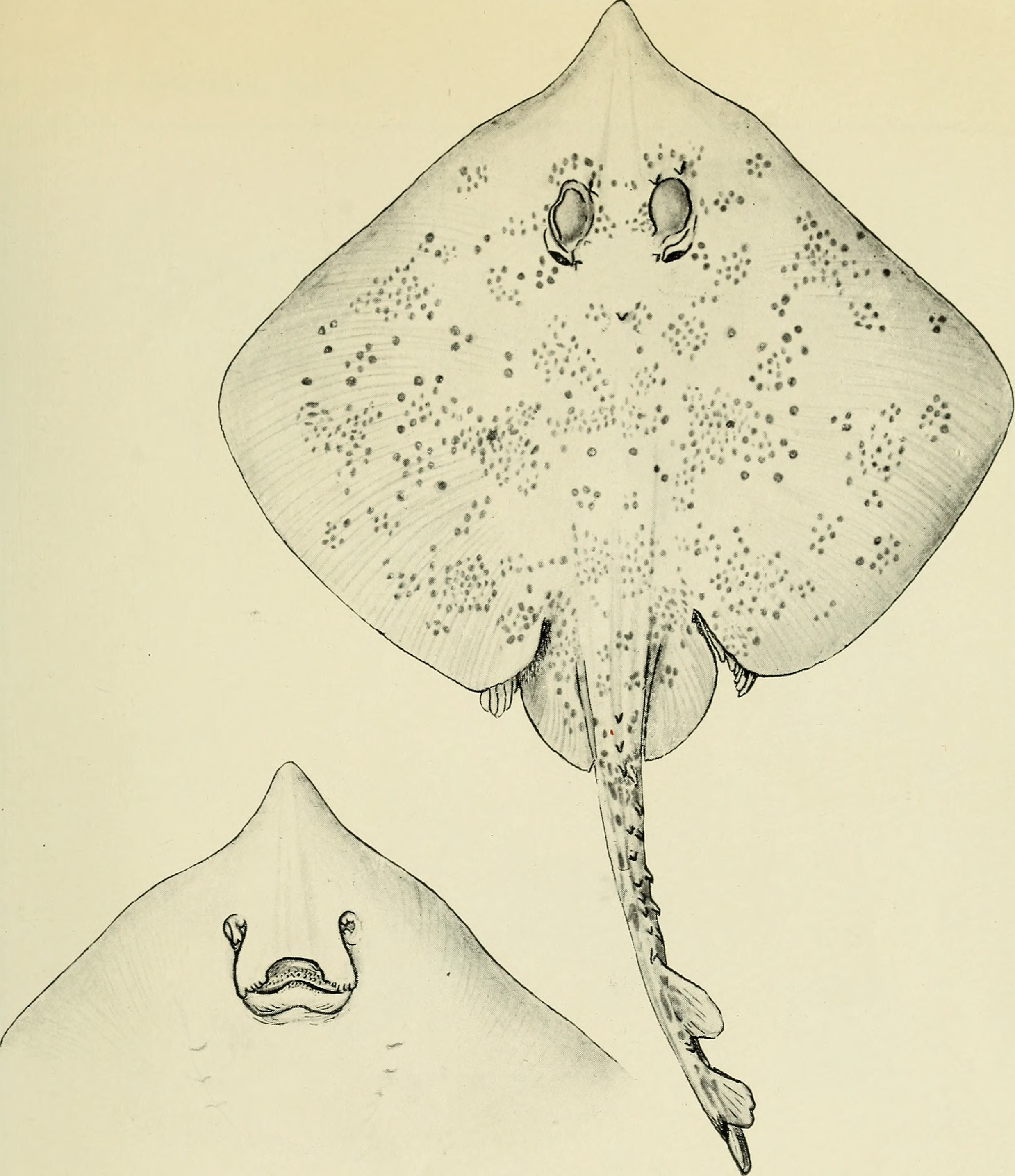
- Lectotype from off North Reef, Queensland by Joyce Allan

Conservation status
- Least Concern (IUCN 3.1)

Scientific classification
- Kingdom: Animalia
- Phylum: Chordata
- Class: Chondrichthyes
- Subclass: Elasmobranchii
- Order: Rajiformes
- Family: Rajidae
- Genus: Dentiraja
- Species: D. polyommata

Binomial name
- Dentiraja polyommata (J. D. Ogilby, 1910)

Synonyms
- Dipturus polyommata; Pavoraja polyommata; Raja polyommata

= Argus skate =

Species of fish

The argus skate (Dentiraja polyommata) is a species of fish in the family Rajidae. This small, up to 38 cm (1.25 ft) long, skate is endemic to depths of 135–320 m (443–1,050 ft) in the oceans off northeast Australia. It was formerly included in Dipturus or Raja.
