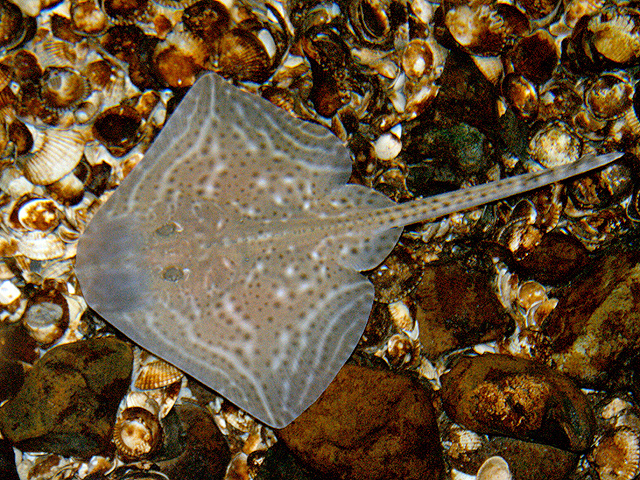

Conservation status
- Near Threatened (IUCN 3.1)

Scientific classification
- Kingdom: Animalia
- Phylum: Chordata
- Class: Chondrichthyes
- Subclass: Elasmobranchii
- Order: Rajiformes
- Family: Rajidae
- Genus: Raja
- Species: R. microocellata

Binomial name
- Raja microocellata Montagu, 1818

= Smalleyed ray =

Species of cartilaginous fish

The smalleyed ray or smalleyed skate (Raja microocellata) is a species of ray in the family Rajidae, the typical rays and skates, from the eastern Atlantic Ocean where it is found in tidal, coastal waters with sandy substrates.

== Description ==
The smalleyed ray is a smaller species of skate which can attain a total length of 87 centimetres (34 in) and a weight of 4.5 kilograms (9.9 lb). It has the typical dorsoventrally flattened body of its family and had distinctively small eyes and spiracles situated on the top of its head. The snout is pointed and the tail begins from rhomboid pectoral discs. It is greyish olive to light brown in colour with lighter patches on its back, there are also pale streaks which run parallel to the margins of the wings. The belly is white. It has spines which run along the tail and the body's midline, these are set very close together and are directed inwards at right angles. Its upper and lower jaws have between 44-52 rows.

== Distribution ==
The smalleyed ray is found in the eastern Atlantic Ocean from the south western waters of Great Britain and Ireland to the Rio de Oro in the Western Sahara. It is absent from the North Sea and the Mediterranean Sea. In Britain and Ireland it is commonest in the Bristol Channel and off Ireland.

== Habitat and biology ==
The smalleyed ray is a shallow water species, they tend not to be found in water deeper than 100 metres (330 ft), which prefers to hunt over substrates consisting of sand, mud and light shingle. They are known to enter estuaries. The main food of the smalleyed ray is fish, although it also likes squid. It is an ambush predator, which buries itself into the substrate from which it launches itself at prey as it comes into reach. They have also been recorded preying on other small marine animals such as worms and crustaceans when the opportunity arises, as well as scavenging on dead fish. Their diet changes as they grow, with juveniles primarily eating crustaceans and adults mainly eating bony fishes. This species is oviparous and the males and females pair in an embrace to mate. The female subsequently lays 54–61 egg cases, rectangular capsules 6.6–10.0 centimetres (2.6–3.9 in) in length and 4.1–6.3 centimetres (1.6–2.5 in) across, with a stiff "horn" at each corner. They are deposited in sand or muddy areas, and once hatched, the young will follow larger objects, including their mother. Egg cases are mostly laid between June and September, and young hatch about 7 months after they are laid.

== Human usage ==
The smalleyed ray is locally important as a quarry species of targeted skate fisheries. It is caught using otter trawl or set-nets but it is also taken as bycatch by demersal trawler and set-net fisheries targeting other species, in wither case the smaller specimens are normally discarded. It is thought that overexploitation of larger skates, which are known to prey on the smalleyed ray, may have benefitted the populations of this species.

== Conservation ==
The IUCN classify the smalleyed ray as Near Threatened because it has a restricted range with a patchy distribution with locally abundant populations which could be vulnerable to over-fishing, habitat destruction and other human-induced forms of disturbance. Although it has been assessed as Near Threatened due to suspected declines which are nearly 30% because of high levels of exploitation, the IUCN has stated that the smalleyed ray is close to meeting the criteria to change this status to Vulnerable.

== Naming ==
Raja microocellata was first formally described by the English soldier and naturalist George Montagu (1753–1815) in a paper published posthumously in 1818, the type locality was given as the south coast of Devonshire. The specific name microocellata means "small-eyed" and refers to the small eyes possessed by this species.
