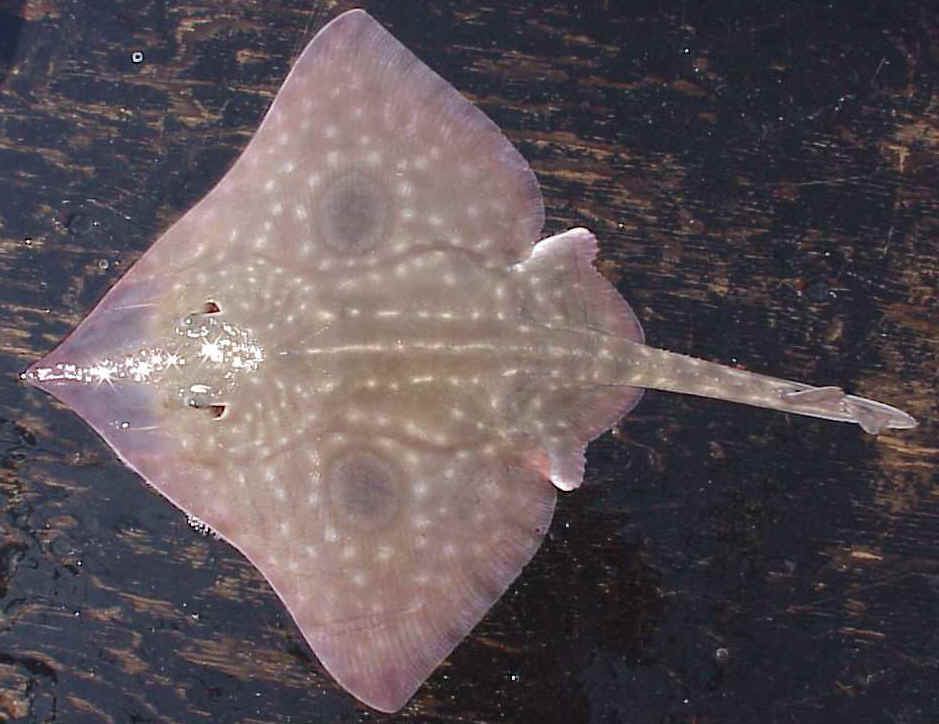

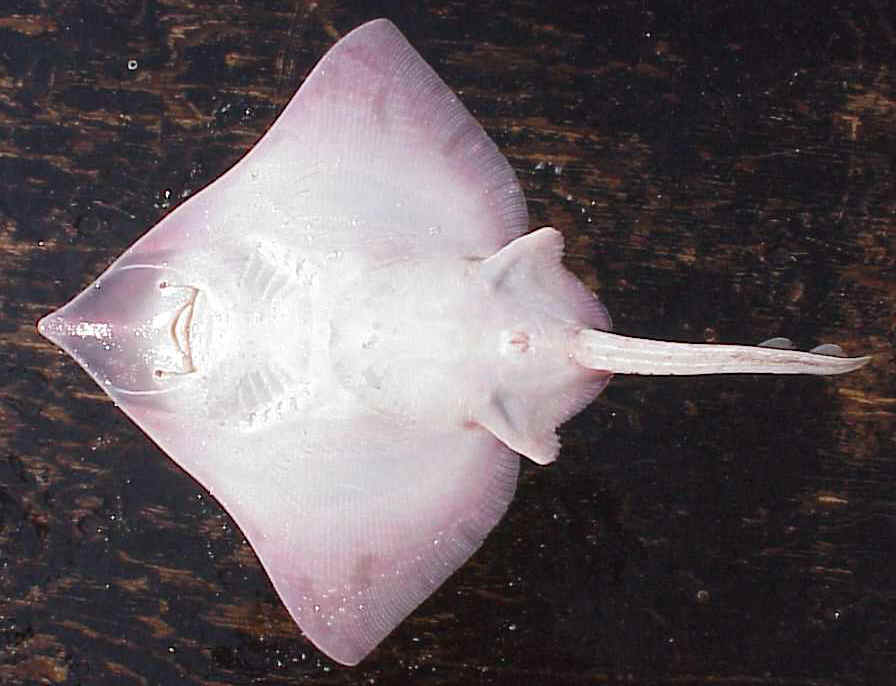

Conservation status
- Least Concern (IUCN 3.1)

Scientific classification
- Kingdom: Animalia
- Phylum: Chordata
- Class: Chondrichthyes
- Subclass: Elasmobranchii
- Order: Rajiformes
- Family: Rajidae
- Genus: Beringraja
- Species: B. binoculata

Binomial name
- Beringraja binoculata (Girard, 1855)
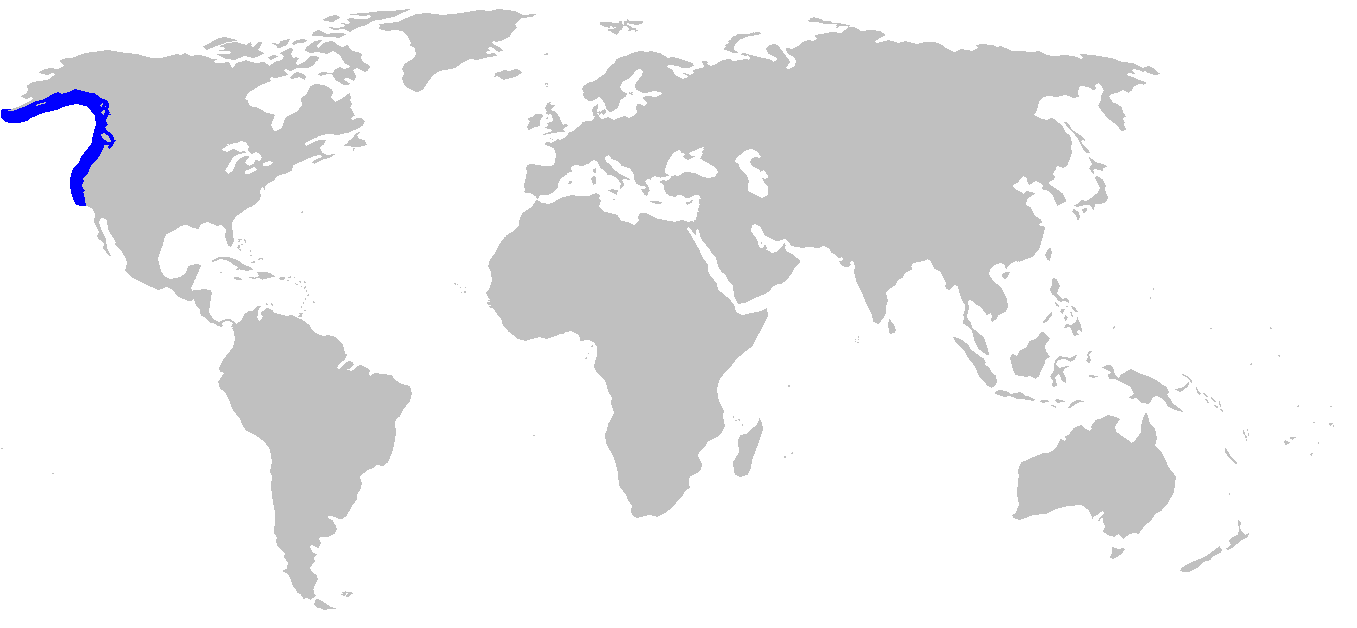
- Range of the big skate

Synonyms
- Dipturus binoculata (Girard, 1858); Raja binoculata Girard, 1858; Raja cooperi Girard, 1858

= Big skate =

Species of cartilaginous fish

The big skate (Beringraja binoculata) is the largest species of skate (family Rajidae) in the waters off North America, and the third largest skate overall (after the flapper skate, Dipturus intermedius and the blue skate, D. batis). They are found along the Pacific Coast from Alaska to Baja California, typically from the intertidal zone to a depth of 120 m (390 ft), and feed on benthic invertebrates and small fishes. They are unusual among skates in that their egg cases may contain up to seven eggs each. This species is one of the most commercially important skates off California and is sold for food.

== Taxonomy ==
This species was described by Charles Frédéric Girard in 1855; its specific epithet binoculata is derived from the Latin bi meaning "two", and oculatus meaning "eyed", referring to the two prominent eyespots on its wings. Girard also described what would later be determined to be a junior synonym of B. binoculata, R. cooperi, based on notes made by James G. Cooper on a decaying big skate found ashore near the entrance of Shoalwater Bay, Washington. In some older literature, this species is placed in the genus Dipturus. In 2012, the big skate was moved from Raja to the new genus Beringraja together with the mottled skate (B. pulchra).

== Distribution and habitat ==
The big skate is found in the north-eastern Pacific Ocean, from the eastern Bering Sea and the Aleutian Islands, as far south as Cedros Island off central Baja California. It is rare south of Point Conception, California. It occurs in coastal bays, estuaries, and over the continental shelf, usually on sandy or muddy bottoms, but occasionally on low strands of kelp. Though reported to a depth of 800 m (2,600 ft), it is usually found no deeper than 120 m (390 ft). It frequents progressively shallower water in the northern parts of its range. This species is abundant off British Columbia, where it prefers a depth of 26–33 m (85–108 ft) and a temperature of 7.6–9.4 °C (45.7–48.9 °F).

== Description ==
The maximum known length of a big skate is 2.4 m (7.9 ft), though this species usually does not exceed 1.8 m (5.9 ft) and 91 kg (201 lb). This species has a flattened, diamond-shaped pectoral fin disk slightly wider than it is long, with a long, moderately pointed snout. The eyes are small and placed just ahead of the large spiracles. The teeth are small with raised cusps, numbering 24-48 rows in the upper jaw and 22–45 in the lower. Two small dorsal fins are on the tail, the anal fin is absent, and the caudal fin is reduced to a simple fold. There is a weak notch in each pelvic fin. Like the clearnose skate (Rostroraja eglanteria) of the Atlantic, the snout area is semi-transparent.

A juvenile has smooth skin, while an adult has small prickles on its dorsal surface and the underside of the snout, between the gill slits, and on the abdominal region. It has two or three thorns on the middle of the back, a row of 12-55 (usually 13–17) thorns along the midline of the tail, and an interdorsal thorn. Some older individuals have a thorn above each eye. The back is colored a mottled brown to reddish brown, olive-brown, or gray, with rosettes of small white spots or scattered dark blotches. Two large dark spots with pale borders occur, one on each wing. The ventral side is white, sometimes with dark spots or blotches.

== Biology and ecology ==
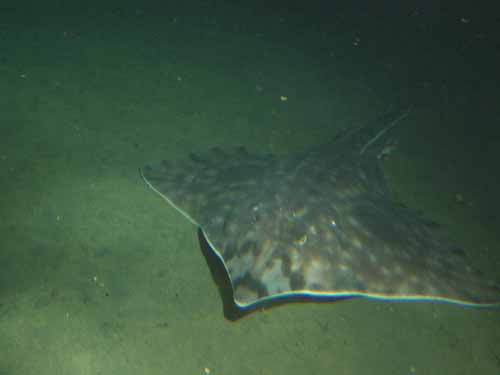
A male big skate resting on the sea floor off Mt. Pinos

Big skates are usually seen buried in sediment with only their eyes showing. They feed on polychaete worms, molluscs, crustaceans, and small benthic fishes. Polychaetes and molluscs comprise a slightly greater percentage of the diet of younger individuals. A known predator of big skates is the broadnose sevengill shark (Notorhynchus cepedianus); the eyespots on the skates' wings are believed to serve as decoys to confuse predators. Juvenile northern elephant seals (Mirounga angustirostris) are known to consume the egg cases of the big skate. Known parasites of the big skate include the copepod Lepeophtheirus cuneifer.

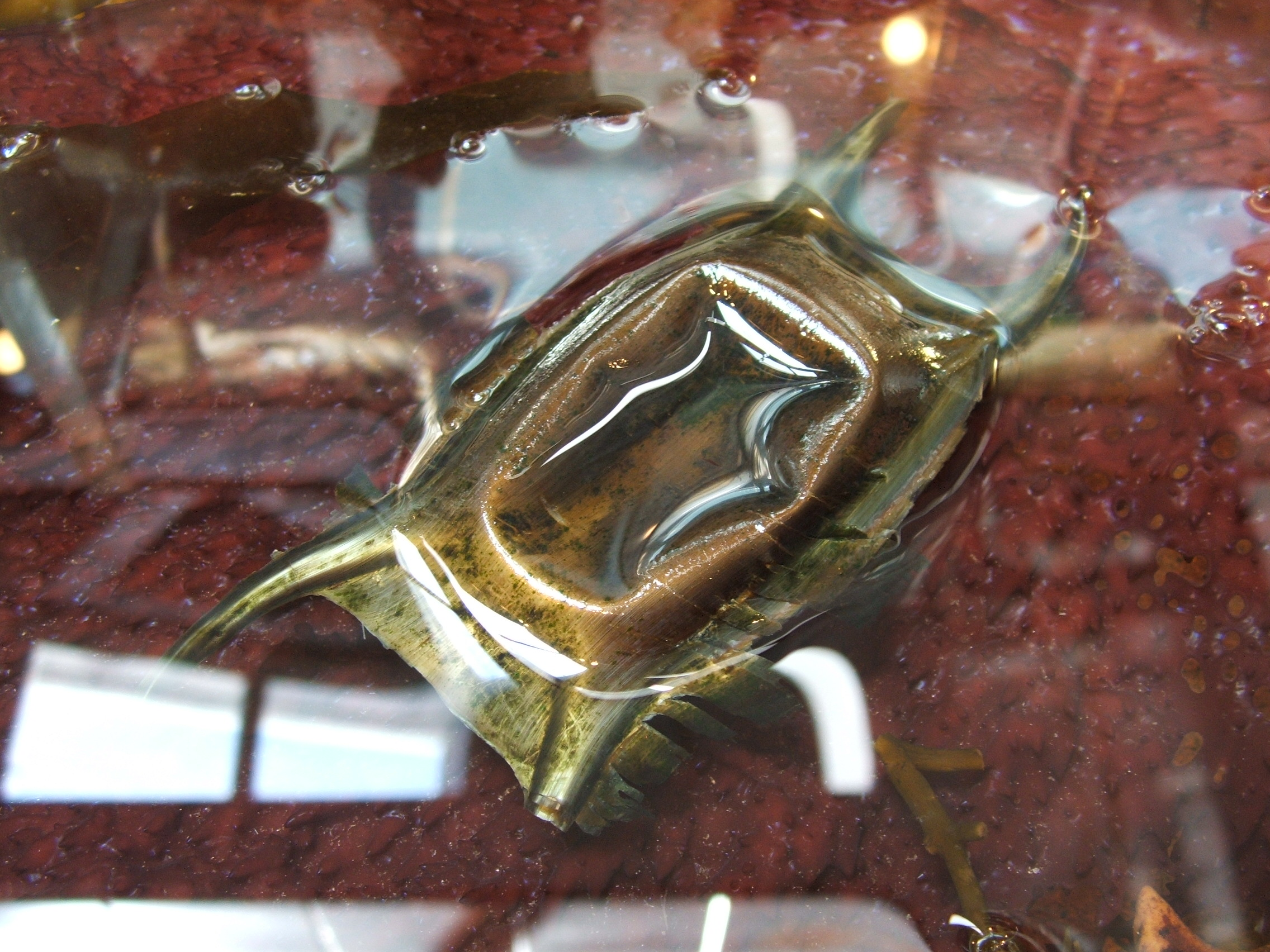
The egg capsule ("mermaid's purse") of a big skate

This species is oviparous, and is one of the few skate species that typically has more than one embryo within each egg capsule, commonly called "mermaid's purses" when they are found washed up on beaches. The egg capsule of a big skate is the largest of any skate, measuring 23–31 cm (9–12 in) long and 11–19 cm (4–7 in) wide. Each capsule is oblong in shape and has a highly arched dorsal surface, nearly flat ventral surface, and parallel lateral edges that become somewhat concave towards the center of the case. At the corners of the case, four blunt, broad horns are seen, with the posterior pair being slightly longer. A single egg capsule may contain one to seven (usually three or four) eggs.

The female deposits her eggs in pairs on sandy or muddy flats; the breeding season is indiscrete, and egg-laying occurs year-round. Females may use distinct spawning beds, as large numbers of egg cases have been found in certain localized areas. The young emerge after 9 months and measure 18–23 cm (7–9 in). Female big skates mature at 1.3–1.4 m (4 ft 3 in – 4 ft 7 in) long and 12–13 years old, while males mature at 0.9–1.1 m (2 ft 11 in – 3 ft 7 in) long and 7–8 years old. The growth rates of big skates in the Gulf of Alaska are comparable to those off California, but differ from those off British Columbia. The lifespans of big skates off Alaska are up to 15 years, while those off British Columbia are up to 26 years.

== Fisheries and stock status ==
Big skates are frequently caught by recreational anglers, who usually release or discard them. They adapt well to captivity and are often displayed in public aquaria. This species is one of the three most important skates fished off the coast of California, though compared to other commercial fisheries, it is of only minor importance. This species is usually taken as bycatch in bottom trawls; the pectoral fins are sold as "skate wings" and are eaten baked or fried, often being labeled as imitation scallops. In the 1990s, the market value of skate wings rose to US$0.40-$1.00 per pound, and catches of the big skate off California increased 10-fold as the trawl fishery began marketing its skate and ray bycatch. In 2003, a targeted fishery for the big skate and the longnose skate (Raja rhina) commenced in the Gulf of Alaska.

Fisheries encountering big skate are managed separately in three areas: Alaska, the Canadian province of British Columbia, and the west coast of the contiguous United States (Washington, Oregon, and California). Stock assessments for big skate have been conducted in all these areas, none of which found that overfishing was occurring. The size of the stock and the estimates of sustainable catch were uncertain in all cases. Big skates are assessed as least concern by the World Conservation Union.
