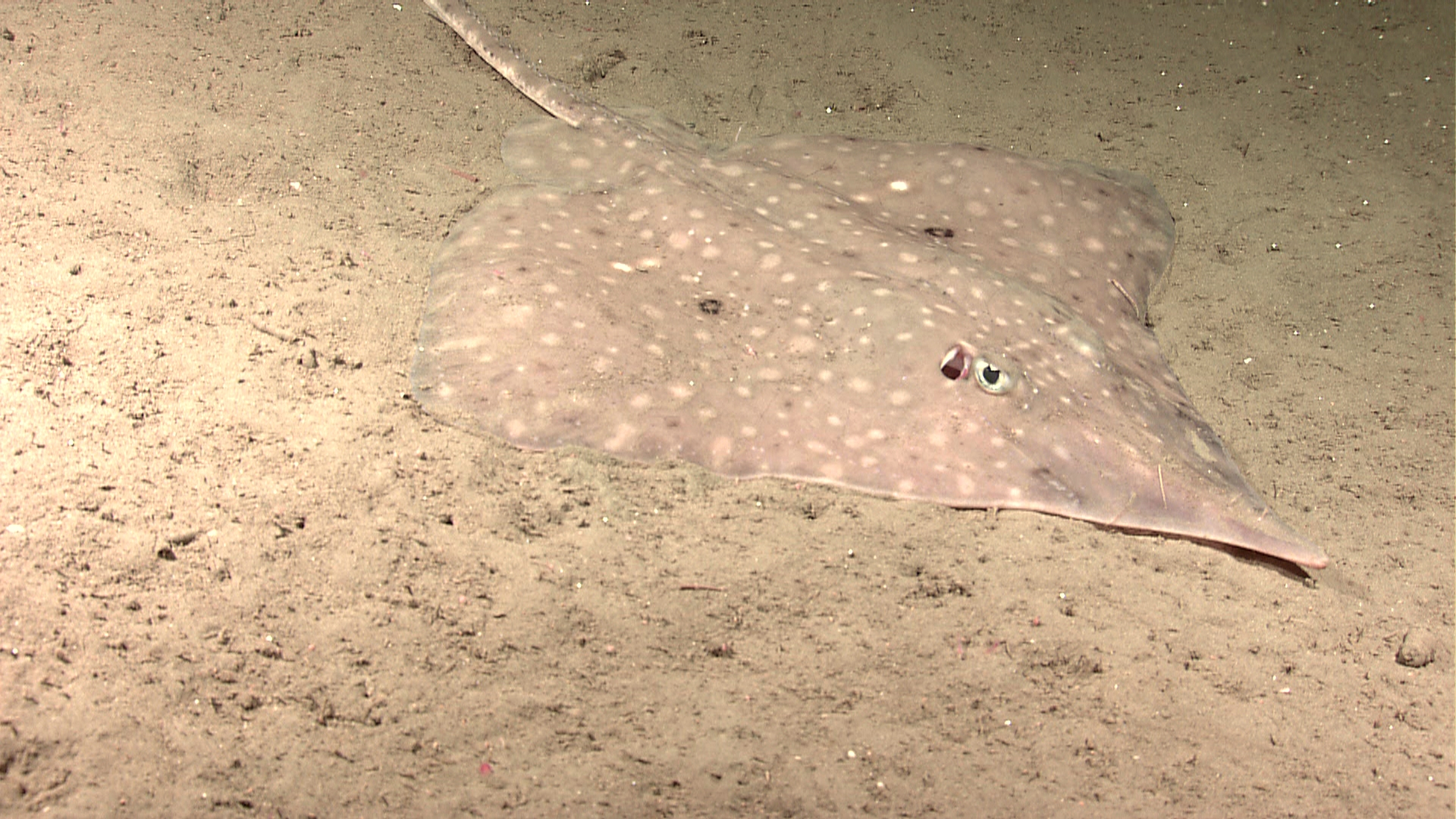
- A longnose skate near Santa Cruz Island in 2011

Conservation status
- Least Concern (IUCN 3.1)

Scientific classification
- Kingdom: Animalia
- Phylum: Chordata
- Class: Chondrichthyes
- Subclass: Elasmobranchii
- Order: Rajiformes
- Family: Rajidae
- Genus: Caliraja
- Species: C. rhina

Binomial name
- Caliraja rhina (Jordan & Gilbert, 1880)

Synonyms
- Beringraja rhina (Jordan & Gilbert, 1880); Raja rhina Jordan & Gilbert, 1880

= Caliraja rhina =

Species of cartilaginous fish

Caliraja rhina, commonly known as the longnose skate, is a species of skate in the family Rajidae from the northeast Pacific. It is found from the eastern Bering Sea and Alaska to Baja California and the Gulf of California. The longnose skate is found at depths of 9–1,069 m (30–3,507 ft) and often deeper than the big skate. The longnose skate was briefly associated with the genus Beringraja, having been previously included in Raja until genetic evidence supported reclassification. It was then reclassified into the new Caliraja genus after an analysis of egg case morphology and the number of embryos per egg case. This issue has not been completely resolved and the scientific names "Raja rhina" and "Beringraja rhina" are still in widespread use.

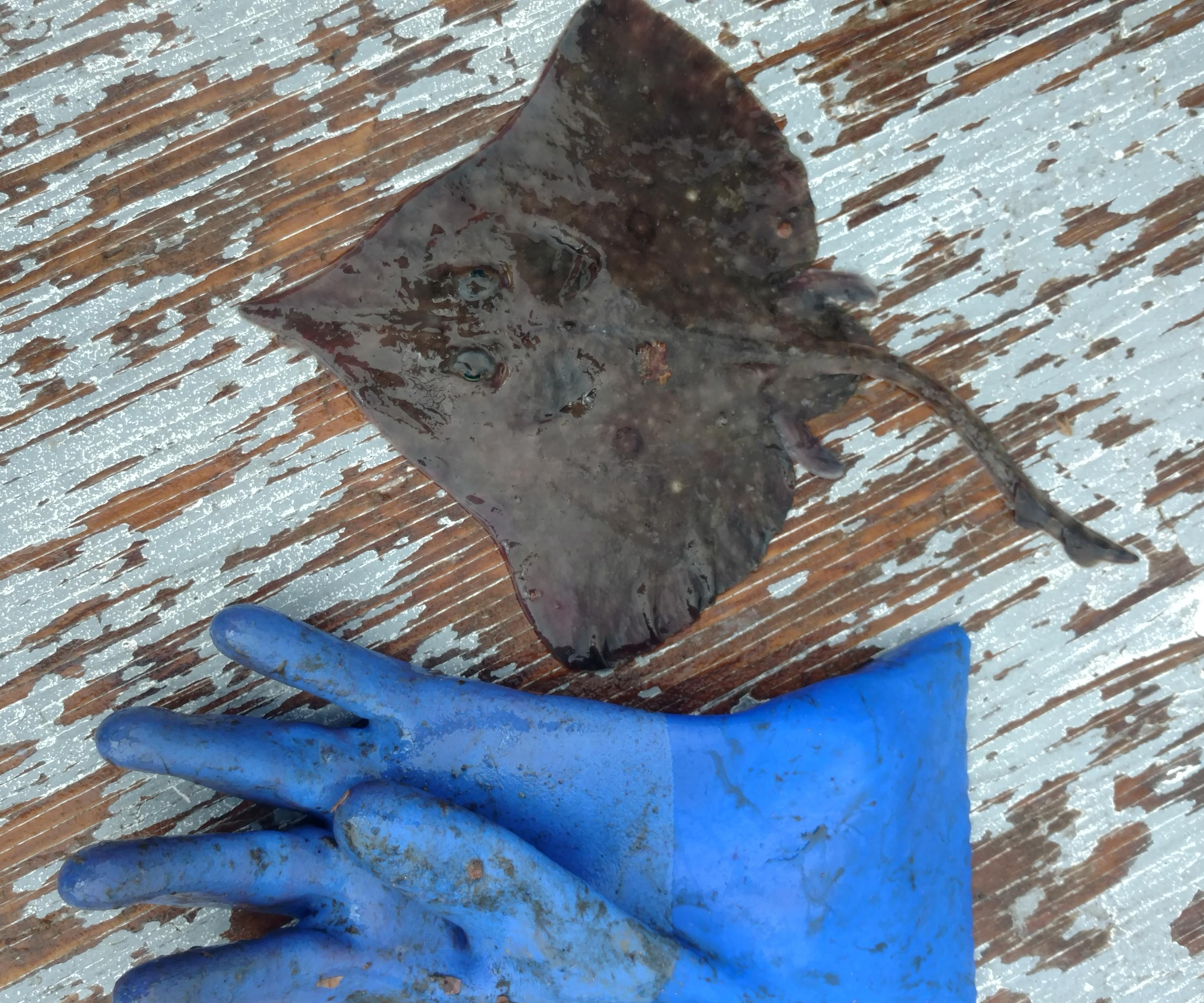
Small longnose skate

== Description ==
The longnose skate has an elongated snout and deeply notched pelvic fins. Maximum size has been reported as 1.8 m (5.9 ft) in length. Maximum age has been estimated as 25 years in Gulf of Alaska and 26 years in British Columbia. The age estimates are based on counting growth bands in vertebrae, a method which has been validated using bomb radiocarbon.

== Distribution and habitat ==
In a recent study published in August 2019, researchers found that this nearshore species tends to dwell in the upper continental slope in highly sedimented areas, and also in association with rock out crops, authigenic carbonate crust, and mixed substrate areas in depths between 200 and 929 m. Longnoses inhabited areas with 3–6 °C temperatures. This research came from the first long-scale, long-term assessment of skates in deepwater of the eastern North Pacific.

== Reproduction ==
The longnose skates egg case is large and smooth, and has large webbed keels on its posterior and anterior margins. The egg case's maximum size is 15 cm (5.9 in) long and 12 cm (4.7 in) wide. There is a single embryo per egg case, unlike members of the Beringraja genus which average 3-5 per egg case.
