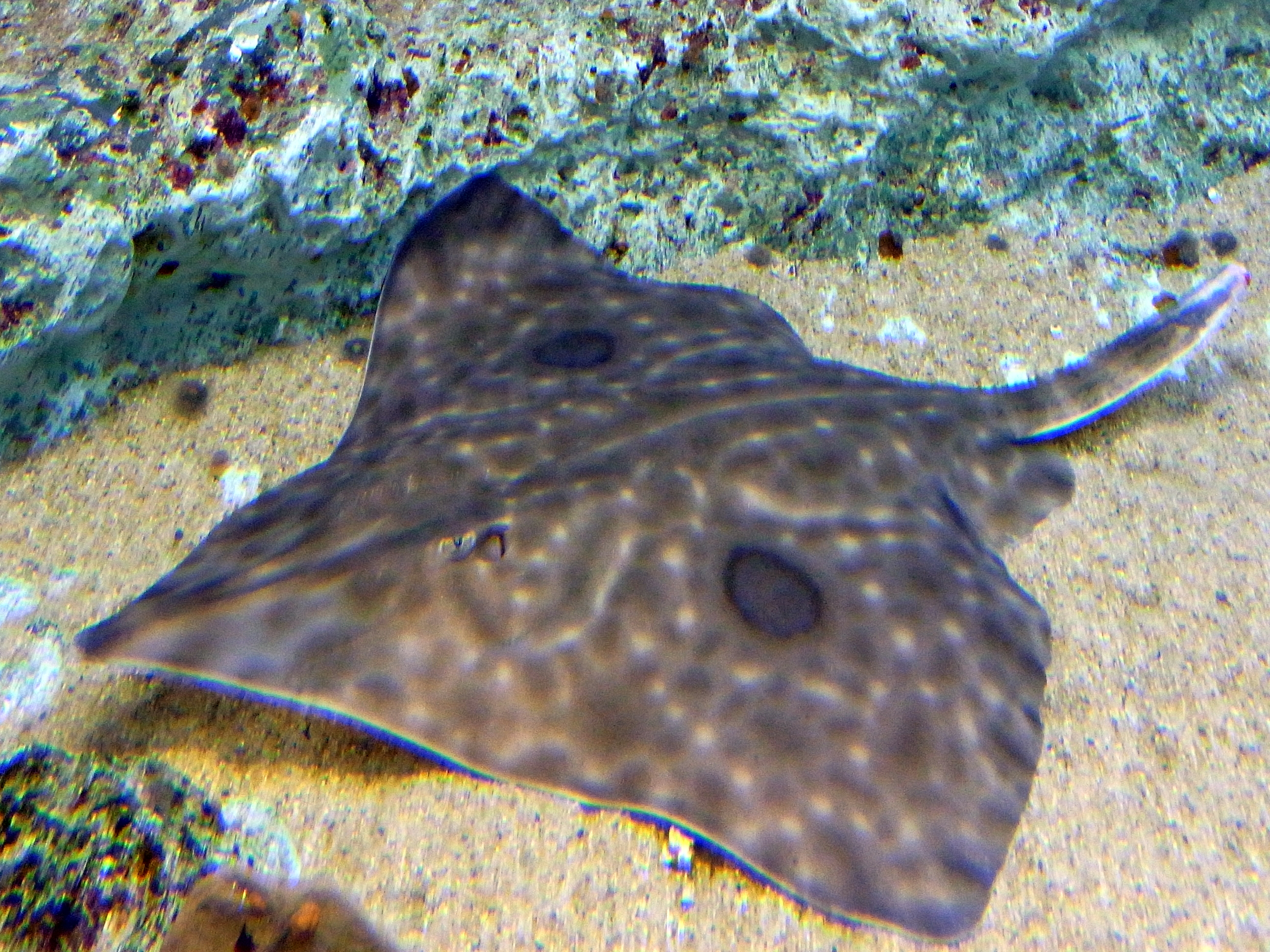

Conservation status
- Endangered (IUCN 3.1)

Scientific classification
- Kingdom: Animalia
- Phylum: Chordata
- Class: Chondrichthyes
- Subclass: Elasmobranchii
- Order: Rajiformes
- Family: Rajidae
- Genus: Beringraja
- Species: B. pulchra

Binomial name
- Beringraja pulchra (F. H. Liu, 1932)

Synonyms
- Raja pulchra F. H. Liu, 1932

= Mottled skate =

Species of cartilaginous fish

The mottled skate (Beringraja pulchra) is a species of skate in the family Rajidae. An inhabitant of shallow coastal waters, it is found in the northwestern Pacific Ocean off Korea, Japan, and China. This species grows to 1.12 m (3.7 ft) long and has a diamond-shaped pectoral fin disc with a long snout. It is characterized by a covering of prickles above and below its snout, but not elsewhere on its body, and a dark ring in the middle of each "wing" (though this may be indistinct in adults).

The diet of the mottled skate consists of shrimp, cephalopods, bony fishes, and crabs. It is oviparous, with females producing egg capsules almost year-round. With the similar big skate (B. binoculata), it is one of only two skate species that regularly places multiple embryos (up to five) into a single egg case. The mottled skate is valued for food in South Korea and Japan. It is subject to heavy fishing, both intentional and bycatch, throughout its range, and its population has declined substantially since the 1980s. As a result, the International Union for Conservation of Nature has assessed it as endangered.

== Taxonomy ==
The mottled skate was scientifically described by ichthyologist Liu Fah-Hsuen in a 1932 issue of The Science Reports of National Tsing Hua University. The type specimen has since been lost. Although initially placed in the genus Raja, systematic studies revealed that it belonged elsewhere. In 2012, it was moved to the new genus Beringraja together with the big skate (B. binoculata).

== Distribution and habitat ==
The mottled skate is found in the temperate waters of the northwestern Pacific Ocean, in the Sea of Okhotsk, the Sea of Japan, the Yellow and Bohai Seas, and the East China Sea, to as far south as Taiwan. Historical records from the 1980s indicate that it was highly abundant around the Korean islands of Daecheong and Heuksando, and the Japanese main island of Hokkaidō. This bottom-dwelling species generally inhabits shallow coastal waters: it is found at depths of 5–30 m (16–98 ft) in the Sea of Okhotsk, and at 5–15 m (16–49 ft) in the Yellow Sea. However, it has been recorded from as deep as 120 m (390 ft).

== Description ==
Reaching a maximum known length of 1.12 m (3.7 ft), the mottled skate has a diamond-shaped pectoral fin disc with a broad, elongated snout that tapers to a point. The length of the head from above is less than four times the distance between the eyes. A notch is in the posterior margin of each pelvic fin. The tail bears a fold running along each side and two small dorsal fins positioned near the tip; the caudal fin is reduced to a low fold no deeper than the lateral tail folds. There is usually only a single thorn on the "nape". Prickles cover the dorsal and ventral sides of the snout, but they do not extend onto the back or belly as in the similar big skate (R. binoculata). This species is brownish above and lighter below. Young rays have a pair of large, dark rings on the disc, which fade or change into light blotches with age; adults also gain darker reticulations over upper surface of the disc.

== Biology and ecology ==
The mottled skate feeds primarily on shrimp, cephalopods, bony fishes, and crabs. In the Yellow Sea, by far the most important prey species is the shrimp Crangon affinis, while the shrimp Trachypenaeus curvirostris and the sandlance Ammodytes personatus also contribute substantially to its diet. The tail contains a pair of lateral electric organs, each consisting of a column of disc-shaped cells. These organs produce a weak electric field that may function in communication.

Like other members of its family, the mottled skate is oviparous. Breeding occurring almost year-round, peaking from April to June and from November to December, and pausing only in midsummer. Females produce 98 to 556 eggs per year (average 240). The eggs are generally deposited on sandy or muddy flats; off Hokkaidō, they are commonly laid inside culturing cages used by scallop farms. The egg capsule is rectangular, measuring 14–18.8 cm (5.5–7.4 in) long and 7–9.4 cm (2.8–3.7 in) across; a deep notch is on each side and short, flattened horns occur at the four corners. The capsule usually contains multiple embryos, up to five; the big skate is the only other skate species known to regularly place more than one embryo into a capsule. Newly emerged skates measure 9.5 cm (3.7 in). Males reach sexual maturity at 47.3 cm (18.6 in) across, and females at 68.5 cm (27.0 in) across.

== Human interactions ==
The mottled skate is a commercially significant food fish in South Korea and Japan. In South Korea, it is the predominant species of skate (known as hong-eo) consumed, and is one of the most expensive fish on the market at $10–30/kg; it is popularly served at wedding feasts. This species is caught intentionally by targeted gillnet fisheries, and incidentally by flounder gillnet fisheries. In Japan, this species is less valued at around $5/kg, and is targeted by a Hokkaidō fishery. It is not sought after by Chinese fisheries, but is taken as bycatch.

The International Union for Conservation of Nature has assessed the mottled skate as endangered. Annual catches by South Korea averaged 2,700 tons in 1991–1993, but only 220 tons in 2001–2003, indicating a 90% population decline over a 10-year period. Japanese fishermen have also reported declines in recent years, while off China, the numbers of all fish species are diminishing due to overexploitation and habitat degradation. The overall decline in the mottled skate population has been estimated at over 30% since the 1980s, and may in fact be severe enough to warrant a status of endangered. This species is not currently the subject of any conservation or management schemes.
