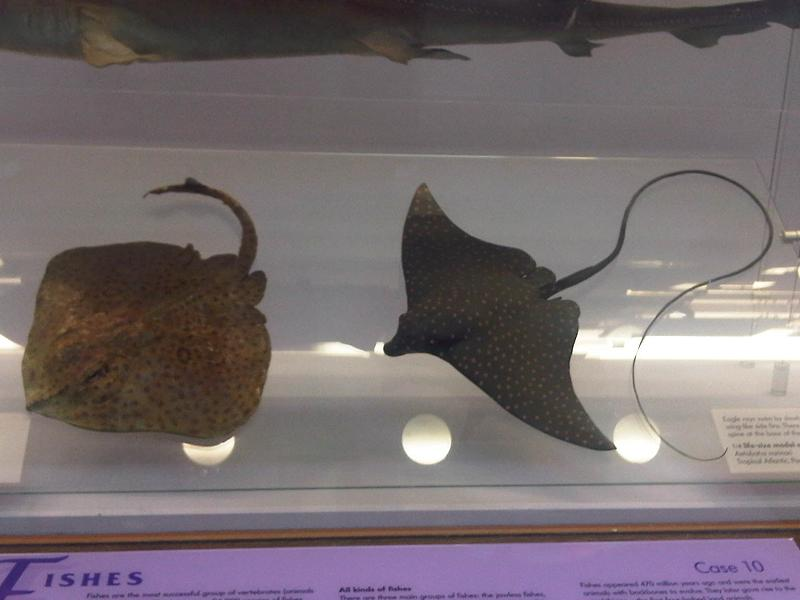
- Speckled ray (Raja polystigma) (on the left) at the Natural History Museum in London, England.

Scientific classification
- Kingdom: Animalia
- Phylum: Chordata
- Class: Chondrichthyes
- Subclass: Elasmobranchii
- Order: Rajiformes
- Family: Rajidae
- Genus: Raja
- Species: R. polystigma

Binomial name
- Raja polystigma Regan, 1923

= Raja polystigma =

Species of fish

Raja polystigma, also known as the speckled skate, is a species of hardnose skate.

== Description ==
The speckled skate has a short and blunt snout with a slightly pronounced tip. Its dorsal surface has a greyish to greenish-brown colouration with many dark and pale spots, and it is mostly smooth in texture. The ventral surface is whitish with darker disc margins, and is smooth apart from the snout and anterior edge of the disc, which have prickles. It has a median row with about 22-28 thorns up to the first dorsal fin, and one interdorsal thorn. Adult males have both alar and malar thorns. The upper and lower jaws have between 50-60 rows. The maximum total length of a speckled skate has been measured as 71 centimetres (28 in).

== Distribution and habitat ==
The speckled skate lives in the Mediterranean Sea. It has been observed to occur at depths between 100–400 metres (330–1,310 ft), with a possible range of 10–650 metres (33–2,133 ft). It lives over seabeds of soft substrate. It has been observed on iNaturalist on the areas of the sea near Algeria, Croatia, Barcelona in Spain, and Marseille in France.

== Biology ==
The speckled skate is oviparous and females can lay 20-62 egg cases annually, primarily during the winter. The egg cases measure 4–7 centimetres (1.6–2.8 in) in length and 3–4 centimetres (1.2–1.6 in) in width. The total length at birth is around 10–12 centimetres (3.9–4.7 in). Speckled skates reach maturity at a total length of 40–53 centimetres (16–21 in)The speckled skate eats small fishes and crustaceans.
