= Longnose skate =

Longnose skate can refer to several species of rays (fish):

- Caliraja rhina, from the northeast Pacific
- Dentiraja confusa, found off southeastern Australia
- Dipturus oxyrinchus, from the northeast Atlantic and Mediterranean
