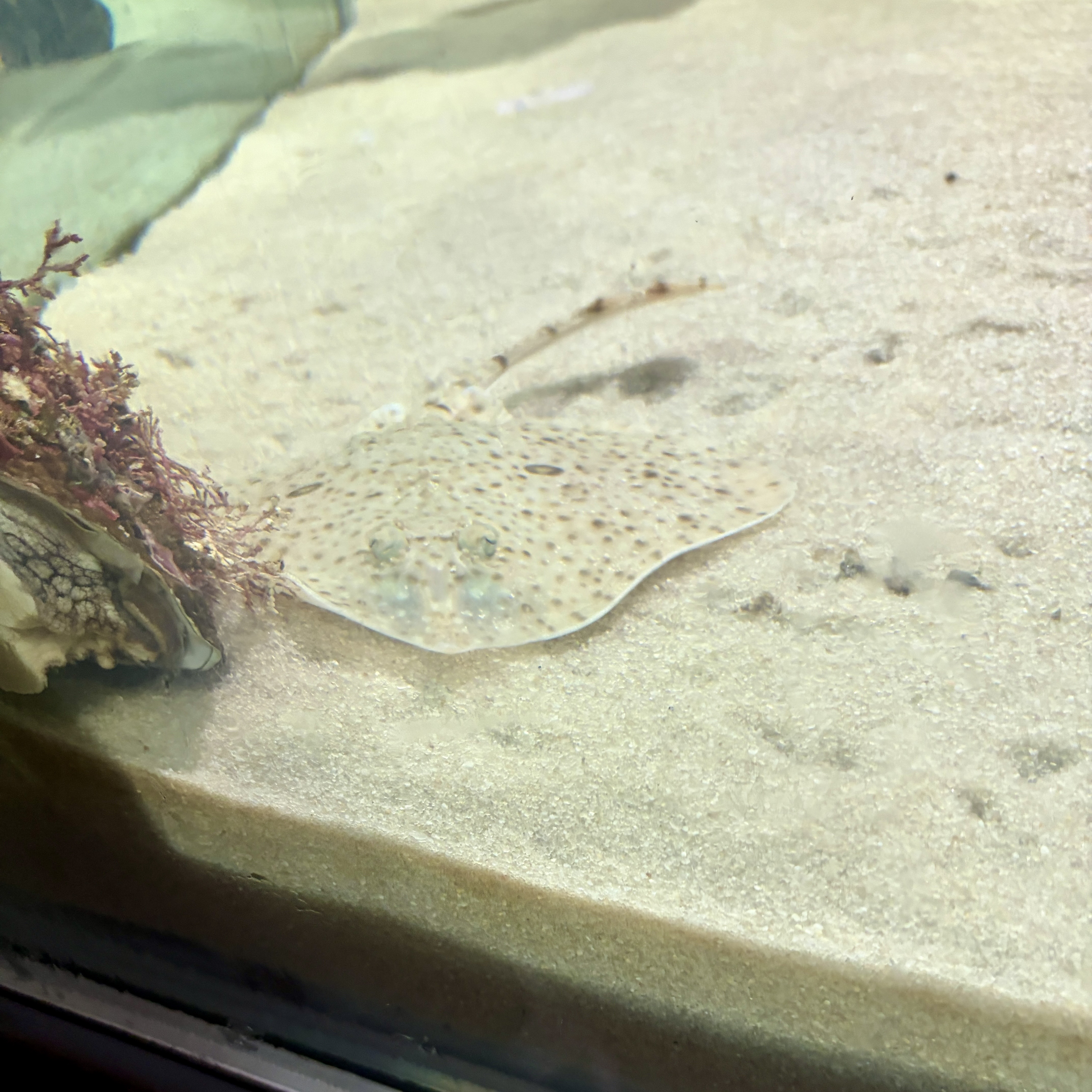
- Cabrillo Marine Aquarium (2026)

Scientific classification
- Kingdom: Animalia
- Phylum: Chordata
- Class: Chondrichthyes
- Subclass: Elasmobranchii
- Order: Rajiformes
- Family: Rajidae
- Genus: Caliraja
- Species: C. inornata

Binomial name
- Caliraja inornata Jordan & Gilbert, 1881

Synonyms
- Raja inornata; Beringraja inornata

= Caliraja inornata =

Species of cartilaginous fish

Caliraja inornata, also known as the California skate, is a species of elasmobranch (cartilaginous fish). It is found in eastern Pacific Ocean waters from southern British Columbia to Baja California Sur. It was named as the type species of the newly organized skate genus Caliraja in 2022.
