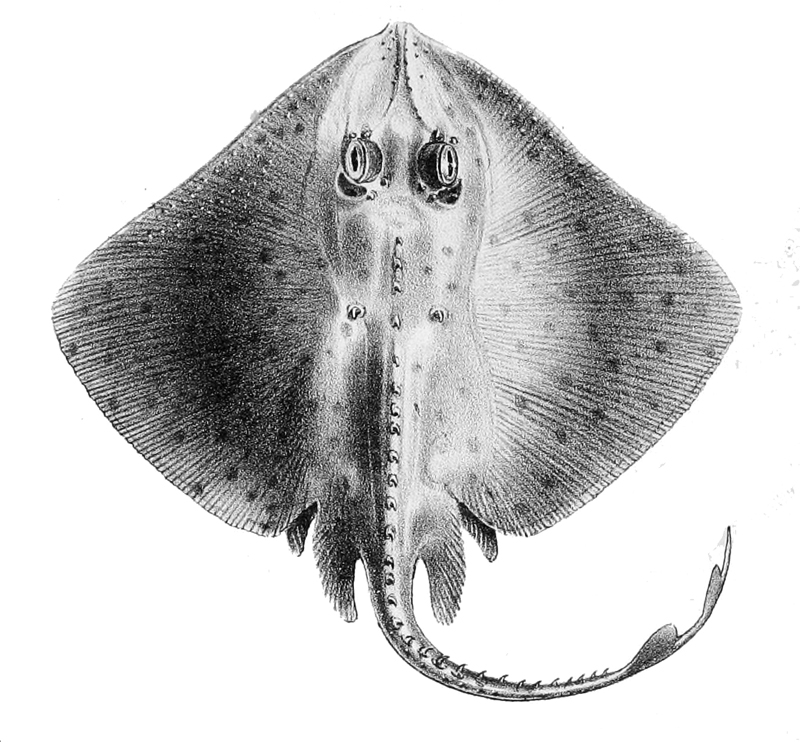

Conservation status
- Least Concern (IUCN 3.1)

Scientific classification
- Kingdom: Animalia
- Phylum: Chordata
- Class: Chondrichthyes
- Subclass: Elasmobranchii
- Order: Rajiformes
- Family: Rajidae
- Genus: Raja
- Species: R. miraletus

Binomial name
- Raja miraletus Linnaeus, 1758

= Raja miraletus =

Species of cartilaginous fish

Raja miraletus, the brown ray, is a species of cartilaginous fish in the family Rajidae (skates), order skate-like fish. They inhabit the subtropical waters of the eastern Atlantic Ocean between 44° N and 35° S. They are found at depths of up to 530 m. Their large, flattened pectoral fins form a rhombic disk with a rounded snout. The maximum recorded length is 63 cm. They lay eggs. They are not an object of targeted fishery.

== Taxonomy ==
The species was first scientifically described in 1758. The species epithet comes from the word mirallet, which means "mirror" in French.

== Range ==
These demersal skates are distributed in the eastern Atlantic, including the Mediterranean Sea, and the western Indian Ocean. Two isolated populations probably exist. These skates inhabit the waters of Angola, Kenya, Namibia, Portugal and the South African Republic. They are found on the continental shelf at depths of up to 530 m, mainly between 50 and 150 m. They prefer sandy bottom.

== Description ==
The wide and flat pectoral fins of these skates form a rhombic disk with a slightly protruding snout tip and rounded edges. On the ventral side of the disk are 5 gill slits, nostrils, and the mouth. The long tail has lateral folds. The snout is short and blunt. The dorsal surface of the disk is covered with thorns only in juvenile skates; in adults, both sides are almost smooth. The coloring of the dorsal surface ranges from brownish-red to ochre with dark spots. The ventral surface is white. In the center of each pectoral fin there is an "eyespots" marking with a blue center and blue and orange borders. The upper and lower jaws have between 36-43 rows. The brown ray has 2 interdorsal thorns and 2 nuchal thorns, and adult males have both alar and malar thorns.

The maximum recorded length is 63 cm.

== Biology ==
Like other skates, these skates lay eggs, encased in a tough, horny capsule with stiff, horny projections at the ends. The capsule length is 4.2–4.6 cm, width 2.7–2.9 cm. embryos feed exclusively on yolk. Young skates tend to follow large objects resembling their mother. The annual fecundity of females is estimated at 40–72 eggs. Females lay eggs year-round, with a peak observed in spring. In the Mediterranean Sea, the length of newborns is 10–11 cm. Males and females reach sexual maturity at lengths of 36–40 cm and 39–44 cm, respectively, at an age of 2–3 years. Life expectancy is estimated at 10 years. The diet consists of decapods, mysids, bony fish, cephalopodss, amphipods, and polychaetes.

These skates are parasitized by cestodes Parachristianella duadecacantha, Grillotia erinaceus, Echinobothrium yiae and Echinobothrium sp., etc..

== Human interaction ==
These skates are not an object of targeted fishery. They are caught as bycatch, and their meat is consumed. The International Union for Conservation of Nature has assessed the conservation status of the species as "Least Concern".
