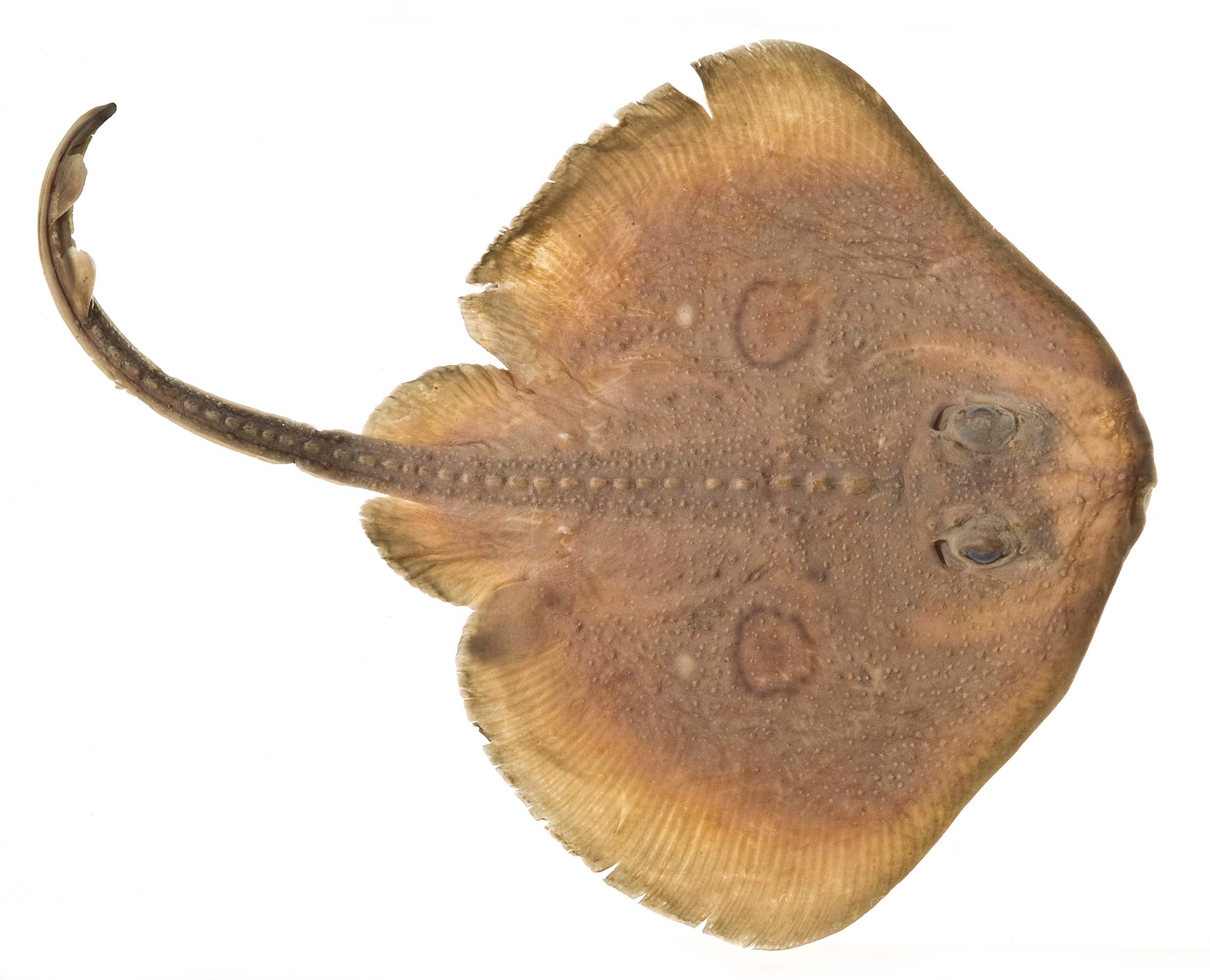
- Caliraja stellulata

Scientific classification
- Kingdom: Animalia
- Phylum: Chordata
- Class: Chondrichthyes
- Subclass: Elasmobranchii
- Order: Rajiformes
- Family: Rajidae
- Genus: Caliraja; Ebert, 2022

Type species
- Raja inornata D. S. Jordan & Gilbert, 1881

= Caliraja =

Genus of cartilaginous fishes

Caliraja is a genus of cartilaginous fish, rays, belonging to the family Rajidae, the skates. These skates are found in the Eastern Pacific Ocean.

== Species ==
Caliraja contains the following four species:

- Caliraja cortezensis (McEachran & Miyake 1988) (Cortez skate)
- Caliraja inornata (D. S. Jordan & Gilbert, 1881) (California ray)
- Caliraja rhina (D. S. Jordan & Gilbert 1880) (Longnose skate)
- Caliraja stellulata (D. S. Jordan & Gilbert 1880) (Starry skate)
