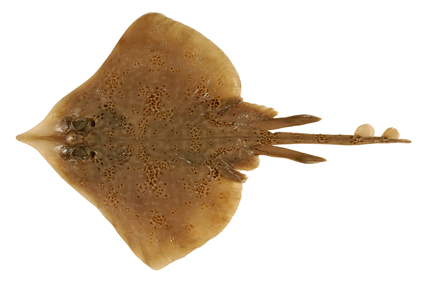

Scientific classification
- Domain: Eukaryota
- Kingdom: Animalia
- Phylum: Chordata
- Class: Chondrichthyes
- Subclass: Elasmobranchii
- Order: Rajiformes
- Family: Rajidae
- Genus: Dentiraja
- Species: D. endeavouri

Binomial name
- Dentiraja endeavouri (Last, 2008)

Synonyms
- Dipturus endeavouri Last, 2008

= Dentiraja endeavouri =

Species of cartilaginous fish

Dentiraja endeavouri, the Endeavour skate, is a species of skate of the family Rajidae native waters off eastern Australia – Queensland and New South Wales.

This species can be found at depths ranging from 110–370 metres (360–1,210 ft) below sea level. Its a saltwater marine species commonly found in the Pacific Ocean, off the coast of Australia.
