= Raja ocellifera =

Scientific classification
- Kingdom: Animalia
- Phylum: Chordata
- Class: Chondrichthyes
- Subclass: Elasmobranchii
- Order: Rajiformes
- Family: Rajidae
- Genus: Raja
- Species: R. ocellifera

Binomial name
- Raja ocellifera Regan, 1906

Species of fish

Raja ocellifera is a species of hardnose skate.

== Description ==
The twineye skate looks much like other skates, though it is rarely seen.

== Habitat ==
Although not much is known about its habitat, it has exclusively been observed in South Africa on iNaturalist, so it could be an endemic species.
