= Dentiraja =

- Dentiraja cerva

Scientific classification
- Kingdom: Animalia
- Phylum: Chordata
- Class: Chondrichthyes
- Subclass: Elasmobranchii
- Order: Rajiformes
- Family: Rajidae
- Genus: Dentiraja; Whitley, 1940

Type species
- Raja dentata Klunzinger, 1872

Genus of fishes

Dentiraja is a genus of skates native to the oceans around Australia. Members of this genus usually grow up to a maximum of 35 – 70 cm, with the longest being Heald's skate (Dentiraja healdi), with a maximum length of about 72 cm.

== Species ==
There are currently 10 recognized species in this genus:

- Dentiraja australis, (Macleay, 1884) (Sydney skate)
- Dentiraja cerva (Whitley, 1939) (white-spotted skate)
- Dentiraja confusa (Last, 2008) (Australian longnose skate)
- Dentiraja endeavouri (Last, 2008) (Endeavour skate)
- Dentiraja falloarga (Last, 2008) (false argus skate)
- Dentiraja flindersi Last & Gledhill, 2008 (pygmy thornback skate)
- Dentiraja healdi (Last, W. T. White & Pogonoski, 2008) (Heald's skate)
- Dentiraja lemprieri (Richardson, 1845) (Thornback skate)
- Dentiraja oculus (Last, 2008) (ocellate skate)
- Dentiraja polyommata (Ogilby, 1910) (argus skate)
