= Pita skate =

Conservation status
- Data Deficient (IUCN 3.1)

Scientific classification
- Kingdom: Animalia
- Phylum: Chordata
- Class: Chondrichthyes
- Subclass: Elasmobranchii
- Order: Rajiformes
- Family: Rajidae
- Genus: Raja
- Species: R. pita

Binomial name
- Raja pita R. Fricke & Al-Hassan, 1995
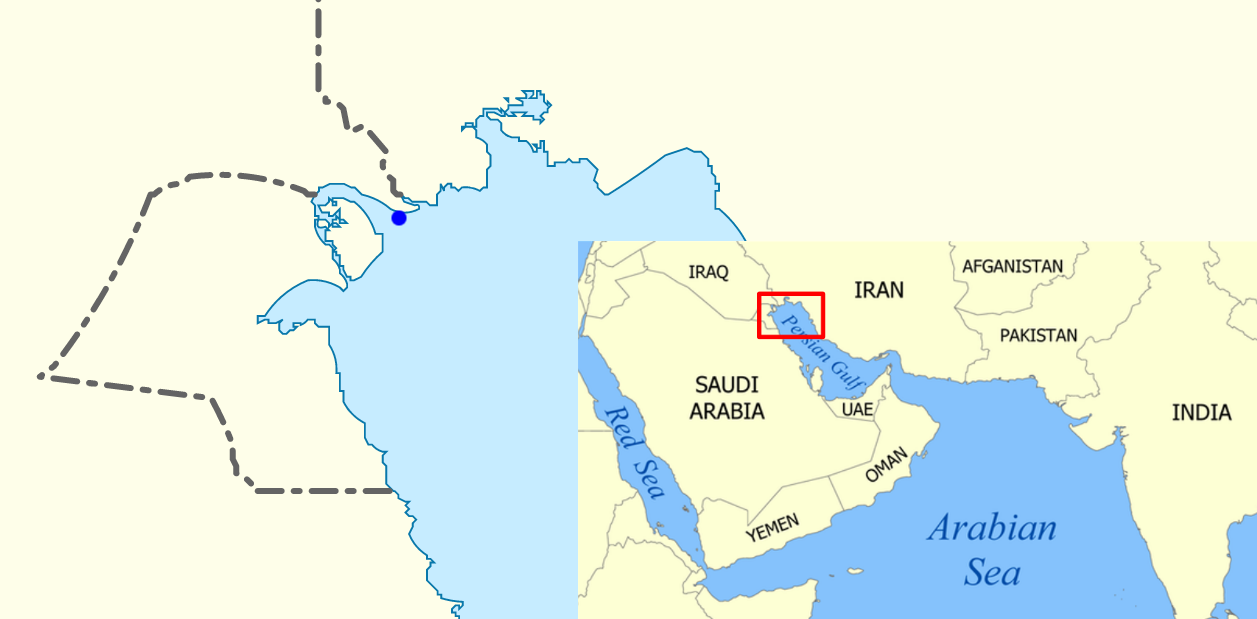
- The pita skate has only been described from one location, in the northern Persian Gulf off the coast of Iraq, near the borders with Kuwait and Iran.

Synonyms
- Okamejei pita (Fricke & Al-Hassan, 1995)

Species of cartilaginous fish

The pita skate (Raja pita) is a medium-sized skate in the family Rajidae. The holotype and only known specimen was found in the northern Persian Gulf, in Iraqi waters. It was collected at a depth of less than 15 m (49 ft).

It is around 46 cm (18 in) in length, and the coloration pattern (described from a specimen preserved in alcohol) is light brown dorsal body with irregular darker brown blotches, and a light brown ventral body. The tail is slightly darker than the body. The name derives from the coloration pattern resembling pita bread.

== Description ==
The species is known from only one female specimen, so variation and sex differences are not known. The holotype specimen is 461.1 mm (18.15 in) in total length, about half being body and half tail. The disc is 549 mm (21.6 in) at the widest point.

The disc forms an approximate quadrangle. The dorsal surface and basal portions of pelvic fins have brown spots on a light brown background. Three brown streaks are noted on the posterior distal pectoral fins. Ventral surface is pale brown, with no variation noted.

Dorsal areas are covered in dermal denticles except for two symmetric patches on the disc and along the posterior margin of the pectoral and pelvic fins. Ventral areas smooth except for a few patches of denticles of varying density. The dorsal surface has a row of 31 thorns along the midline, and a parallel row of three on either side of the midline approximately mid-disc. It has additional thorns around the eyes and snout. The tail has an additional 29 thorns on the midline, and other thorns in regular and irregular rows.

== Biology and life history ==
Information is very limited for this species. It likely lives in muddy bottoms, where it was collected, but the distribution and specifics of habitat preferences are unknown. The eggs of this species are unknown, but like other skates, it is likely oviparous, laying eggs in pairs in open waters, and not guarding the eggs.

Okamejei pita was originally classified into the genus Raja and subgenus Raja (Okamejei). This subgenus was promoted to full genus in 1999. The taxonomic validity of this species was reconfirmed by Compangno in 2007. This species is placed as incertae sedis in the genus Raja.

== Status ==
Despite being known from only one specimen, the species was initially classified critically endangered by the IUCN. However it was reevaluated and was reclassified as data deficient. It is not the target of any fishery, but it may be unrecognized bycatch in several other fisheries, including those using longlines, fish traps, stake nets, and trawls. Like other elasmobranchs, this species is not likely consumed by the Shia population who fish in the area.

In addition to fishing threats, pollution and loss of water quality are possible concerns for this species. Threats include hydrocarbons and biotic threats.

Multiple fisheries surveys of this region failed to find this species, which is taken to indicate this species is rare. No surveys were conducted after 1980, due to the start of the Iran–Iraq War and subsequent military conflicts.
