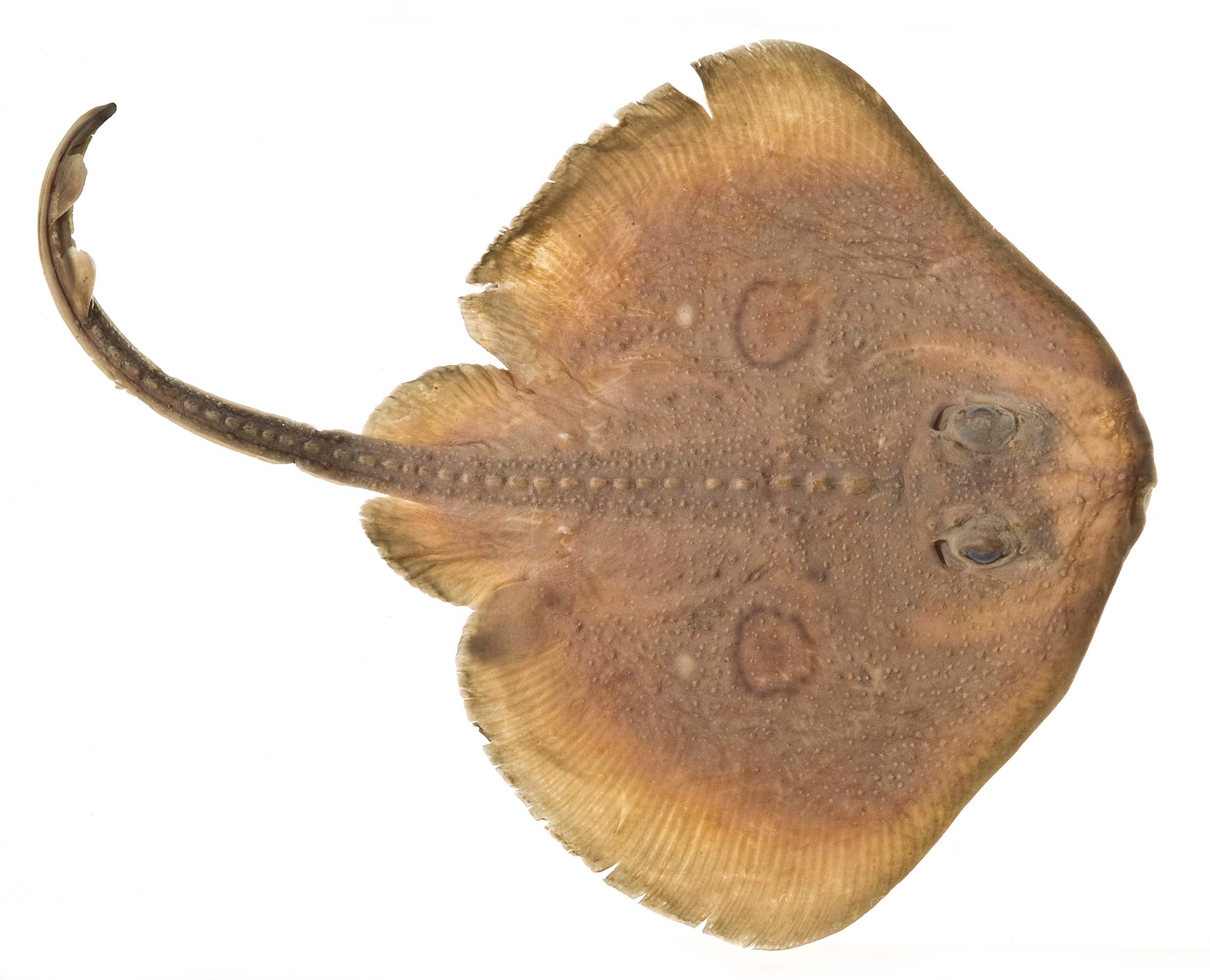

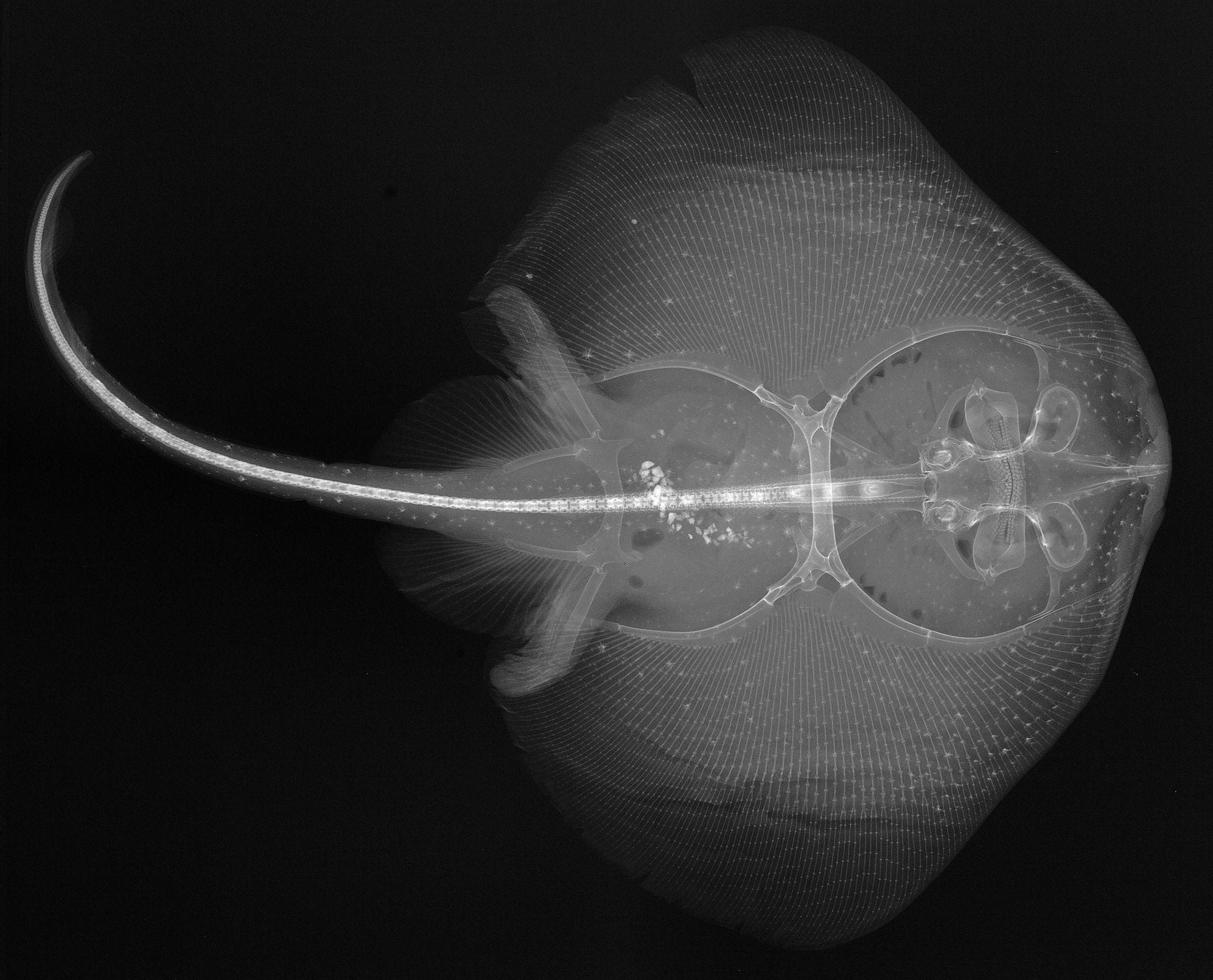
- Conventional and X-ray images

Conservation status
- Least Concern (IUCN 3.1)

Scientific classification
- Kingdom: Animalia
- Phylum: Chordata
- Class: Chondrichthyes
- Subclass: Elasmobranchii
- Order: Rajiformes
- Family: Rajidae
- Genus: Caliraja
- Species: C. stellulata

Binomial name
- Caliraja stellulata (Jordan & Gilbert, 1880)

Synonyms
- Beringraja stellulata (Jordan & Gilbert, 1880); Raja stellulata Jordan & Gilbert, 1880

= Caliraja stellulata =

Species of cartilaginous fish

Caliraja stellulata, commonly known as the Pacific starry skate, rock skate, prickly skate, or starry skate, is a species of cartilaginous fish in the family Rajidae. It is found on rocky bottoms at 18–982 m depths (typically 70–150 m) in the Northeast and Eastern Central Pacific, from Coronado Bank in northern Baja California in Mexico to Barkley Sound in British Columbia, Canada. Females reach a maximum total length of 76.1 cm and a maximum age of 15 years, while males can be up to 71.7 cm long and live up to 14 years; the total length at birth is 15.5–22.5 cm. This skate prefers cold water with a temperature of 4.1–11.6°C (average 8.9°C).

== Description ==
Caliraja stellulata skates have a row of strong spines along their mid-dorsal lines. They also have large spines on their shoulder girdles. A row of small spines is located on the inner edge of the orbit. Clusters of moderate spines are also located along the edge of the pectoral fin. Starry skate males also have a large spine. The dorsal and caudal fins are small; the anal fin is absent. The pectoral fins are broad and attached to the snout and incorporated with the body. Pelvic fins are large and deeply notched. Starry skates have a horizontal, fleshy ridge from either side of the ventral surface to the tail; this is more prominent in the posterior. C. stellulata is a grayish brown color with numerous dark spots of various sizes scattered on its body with a weakly marked eye spots that is often present at the base of the pectoral fins.

== Habitat ==
Starry skates are known to live on hard substrate near rocky reefs. They can also be found on soft sediment, but they are more commonly found on rocky surfaces. They are found at depths of 18–982 m. Within these depths, they are most commonly found in depths of 70-150 m.

== Reproduction and lifecycle ==
The starry skate is oviparous, with a generation length of 8–12 years. The egg cases of the starry skate are striated and have long, robust horns. C. stellulata can reproduce year round and does not have a distinct cycle. Its size at birth is 15.5-22.5 cm total length. The young tend to follow large objects, which may be their mother. First maturity in females is 47.4 cm length and 9 years of age. At 100% maturity, females reach a length of 69.2 cm and are 15 years old. First maturity for males is 46.0 cm long and 6 years old. Males are 65.8 cm and 13 years old when they reach 100% maturity.

== Distribution ==
Caliraja stellulata can be found from the Bering Sea to Northern Baja California. The Berring Sea population may be a different species. In this case, the northernmost location of C. stellulata would be the Karkley Sound in British Columbia.

== Etymology ==
The species name, stellulata, is derived from the Latin word stellula, meaning small star.
