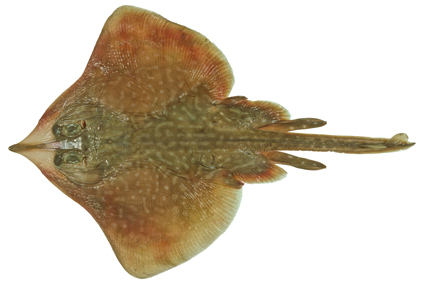

Conservation status
- Near Threatened (IUCN 3.1)

Scientific classification
- Domain: Eukaryota
- Kingdom: Animalia
- Phylum: Chordata
- Class: Chondrichthyes
- Subclass: Elasmobranchii
- Order: Rajiformes
- Family: Rajidae
- Genus: Dentiraja
- Species: D. australis

Binomial name
- Dentiraja australis (Macleay, 1884)

Synonyms
- Raia australis, Macleay, 1884; Okamejei australis, (Macleay, 1884); Dipturus australis, (Macleay, 1884)

= Sydney skate =

Species of cartilaginous fish

The Sydney skate (Dentiraja australis) is a species of skate of the family Rajidae native to waters off the east coast of Australia.

== Taxonomy ==
Scottish-Australian naturalist William John Macleay described the species as Raja australis in 1884, from specimens collected from a trawl off the south head of Botany Bay. He was excited by the find of a skate species in Sydney waters and wondered about its potential as a food item. He observed, "As an article of food, skate has never been much in favour here, in fact, except in French cafés and places of that kind." It was placed in the genus Dipturus in 2002, with other members of the then subgenus Dentiraja before the group was raised to genus level as a whole in 2016, when it gained its current binomial name Dentiraja australis.

As well as Sydney skate, the species is also known as common skate, Pommy skate, or simply skate.

== Description ==
Generally between 43 and 48 centimetres (17 and 19 in) long, the Sydney skate can reach 55 centimetres (22 in) in length. The upperparts are brown, with lighter color on the snout and pectoral fins, while the underparts are white.

== Distribution and habitat ==
The Sydney skate is found on the continental shelf off the east coast of Australia, at depths of 20 to 325 metres (66 to 1,066 ft).

Once one of the most abundant skate species the continental shelf off Eastern Australia, the Sydney skate has drastically declined in numbers. Skate species declined in trawl catches off the New South Wales central and south coast by 83% between 1976/1977 and 1996/1997.

It is one of four species identified as threatened with extinction by trawling in a 2021 report.
