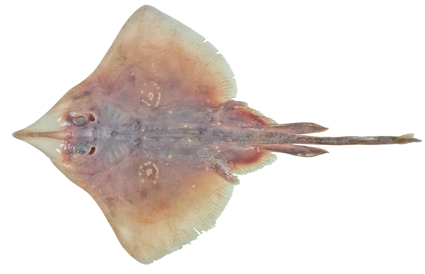

Scientific classification
- Domain: Eukaryota
- Kingdom: Animalia
- Phylum: Chordata
- Class: Chondrichthyes
- Subclass: Elasmobranchii
- Order: Rajiformes
- Family: Rajidae
- Genus: Dentiraja
- Species: D. falloarga

Binomial name
- Dentiraja falloarga (Last, 2008)

Synonyms
- Dipturus falloargus, Last, 2008

= False argus skate =

Species of cartilaginous fish

The false argus skate (Dentiraja falloarga) is a species of skate of the family Rajidae native waters off northwestern Australia.
