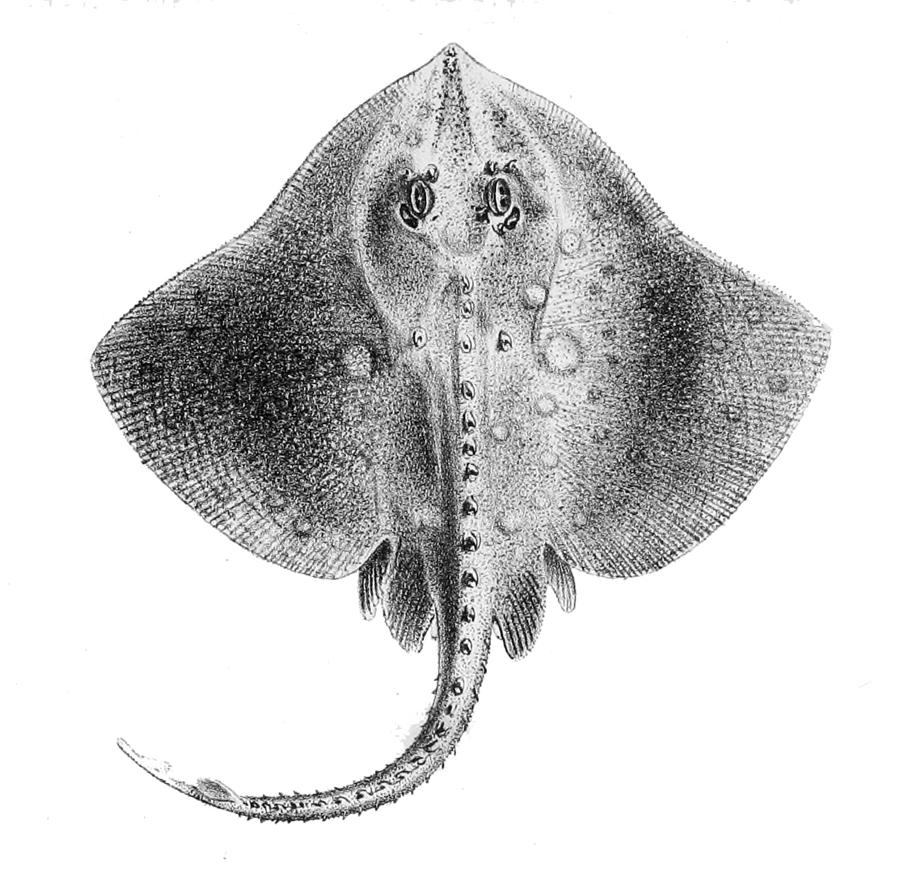

Conservation status
- Vulnerable (IUCN 3.1)

Scientific classification
- Kingdom: Animalia
- Phylum: Chordata
- Class: Chondrichthyes
- Subclass: Elasmobranchii
- Order: Rajiformes
- Family: Rajidae
- Genus: Raja
- Species: R. maderensis

Binomial name
- Raja maderensis Lowe, 1838

= Raja maderensis =

Species of fish

Raja maderensis, also known as the Madeiran ray or Madeiran skate, is a species of hardnose skate.

== Description ==
The Madeiran skate has a maximum total length of 80 centimetres (31 in) and reaches maturity at a length between 50–60 centimetres (20–24 in). The dorsal surface is prickly and dark brown with a dense pattern of light spots. The ventral surface is white in colour and has thick dark disc margins, it occasionally has dark blotches around the mid body. The ventral surface of juveniles is smooth, but it becomes prickly with age. The snout of the Madeiran skate is blunt and moderately long, and it has a slightly pronounced tip. The tail is marginally longer than the disc, and has 2-3 interdorsal thorns. Adult males have both alar and malar thorns. The upper and lower jaws have between 39-49 rows.

== Distribution and habitat ==
Raja maderensis appears to only be found in the shelf and upper slope of Madeira. Specimens possibly attributable to this species or one very similar are reported from the Azores, with their taxonomic placement pending assessment and clarification as of 2015.

The Madeiran skate is a benthic species, and it occurs from shallows to a depth of 150 metres (490 ft). It has been found over both hard and soft seabeds.

== Reproduction ==
The Madeiran skate is oviparous.

== Etymology ==
Madeira, a Portuguese archipelago in the Atlantic Ocean.
