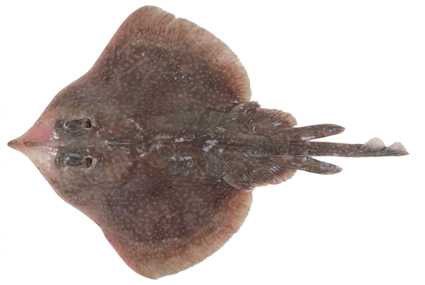

Scientific classification
- Domain: Eukaryota
- Kingdom: Animalia
- Phylum: Chordata
- Class: Chondrichthyes
- Subclass: Elasmobranchii
- Order: Rajiformes
- Family: Rajidae
- Genus: Dentiraja
- Species: D. confusa

Binomial name
- Dentiraja confusa (Last, 2008)

Synonyms
- Dipturus confusus, Last, 2008

= Australian longnose skate =

Species of cartilaginous fish

The Australian longnose skate (Dentiraja confusa) is a species of skate of the family Rajidae native waters off eastern Australia – New South Wales, Victoria and Tasmania.
