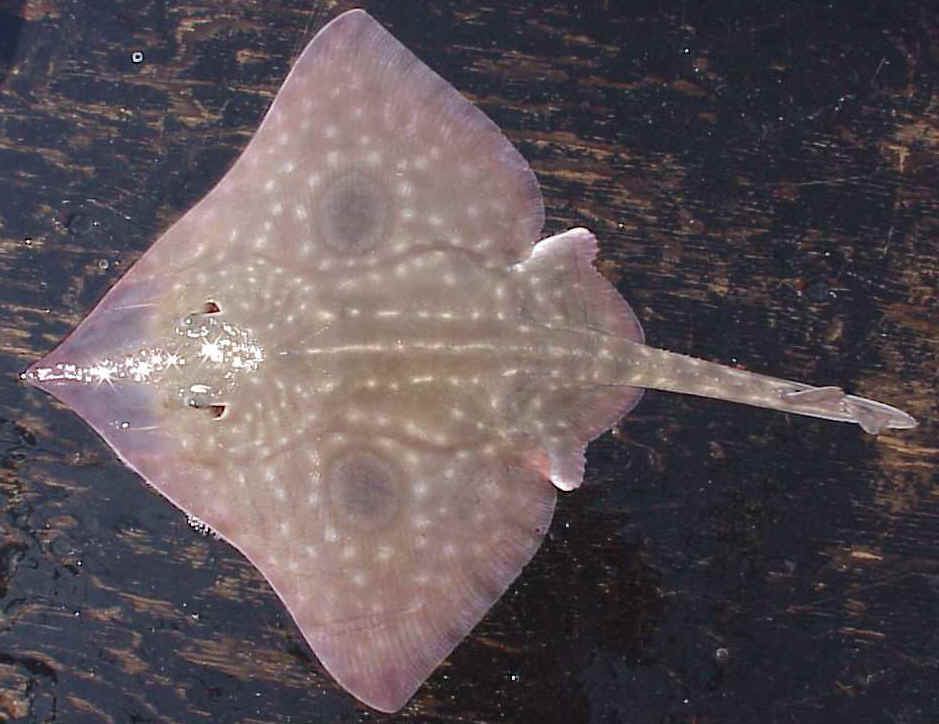
- Big skate, Beringraja binoculata

Scientific classification
- Kingdom: Animalia
- Phylum: Chordata
- Class: Chondrichthyes
- Subclass: Elasmobranchii
- Order: Rajiformes
- Family: Rajidae
- Genus: Beringraja; Ishihara, Treloar, Bor, Senou & Jeong, 2012

Type species
- Raja binoculata Girard, 1855

= Beringraja =

Genus of cartilaginous fishes

Beringraja is a genus of skates in the family Rajidae with up to six described species. Formerly, they were included in the genus Raja until 2012, when the genus Beringraja was erected for the two species which had multiple embryos per egg capsule. Genetic evidence has led to four additional species being proposed for inclusion in the genus, although this issue has not been completely resolved. These large skates are found in the North Pacific.

== Species ==
There are two species in this genus:

- Beringraja binoculata (Girard, 1855) (Big skate)
- Beringraja pulchra (Liu, 1932) (Mottled skate)
