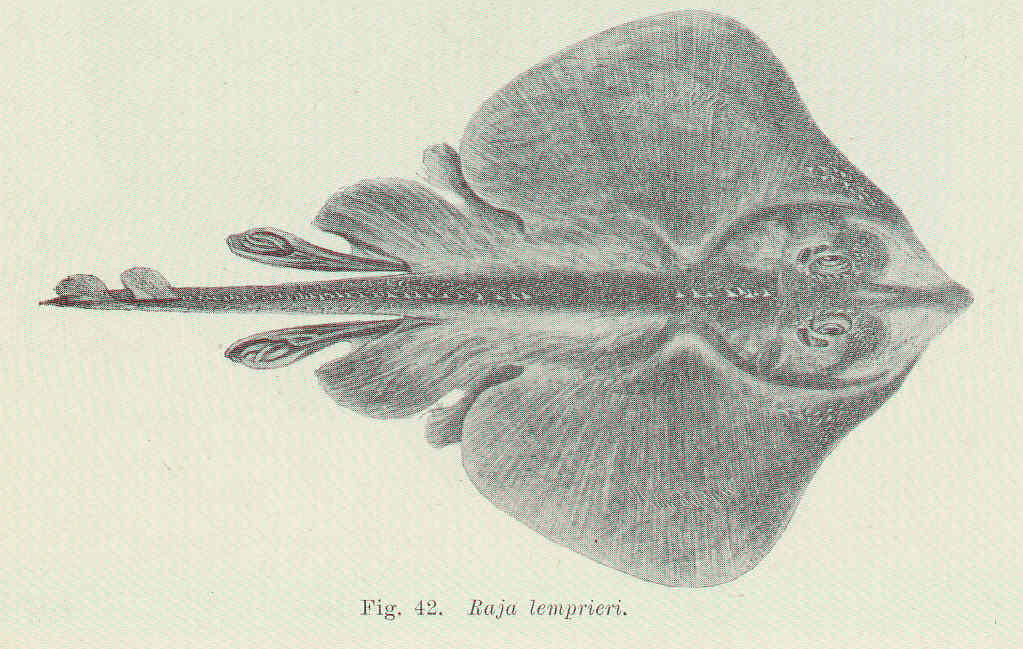

Conservation status
- Least Concern (IUCN 3.1)

Scientific classification
- Kingdom: Animalia
- Phylum: Chordata
- Class: Chondrichthyes
- Subclass: Elasmobranchii
- Order: Rajiformes
- Family: Rajidae
- Genus: Dentiraja
- Species: D. lemprieri

Binomial name
- Dentiraja lemprieri (J. Richardson, 1845)
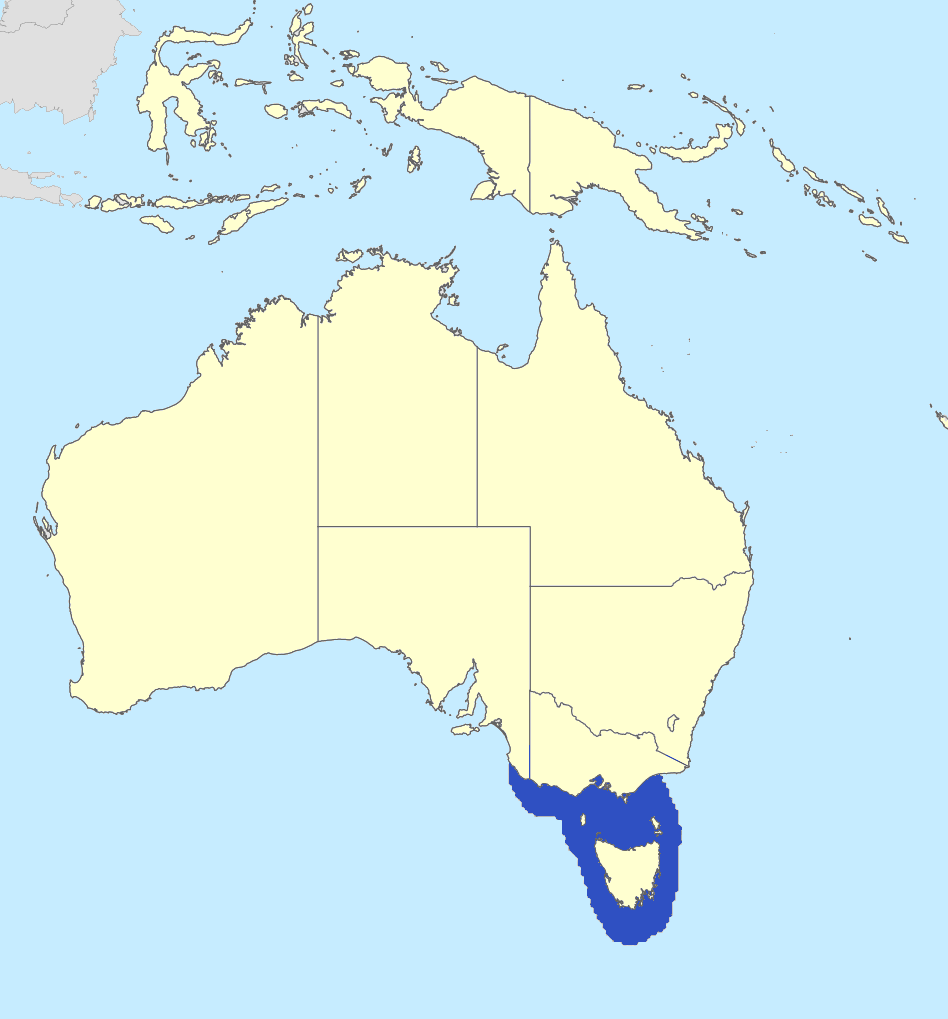

= Thornback skate =

Species of cartilaginous fish

The thornback skate (Dentiraja lemprieri) is a species of skate of the family Rajidae. A bottom-dwelling fish, it is endemic to Australia, occurring in relatively shallow waters from near-shore to 170 metres. The thornback skate can grow up to 52 cm long.

The species was collected by Thomas Lempriere from Tasmanian waters and described and named in Lempriere's honour by John Richardson.
