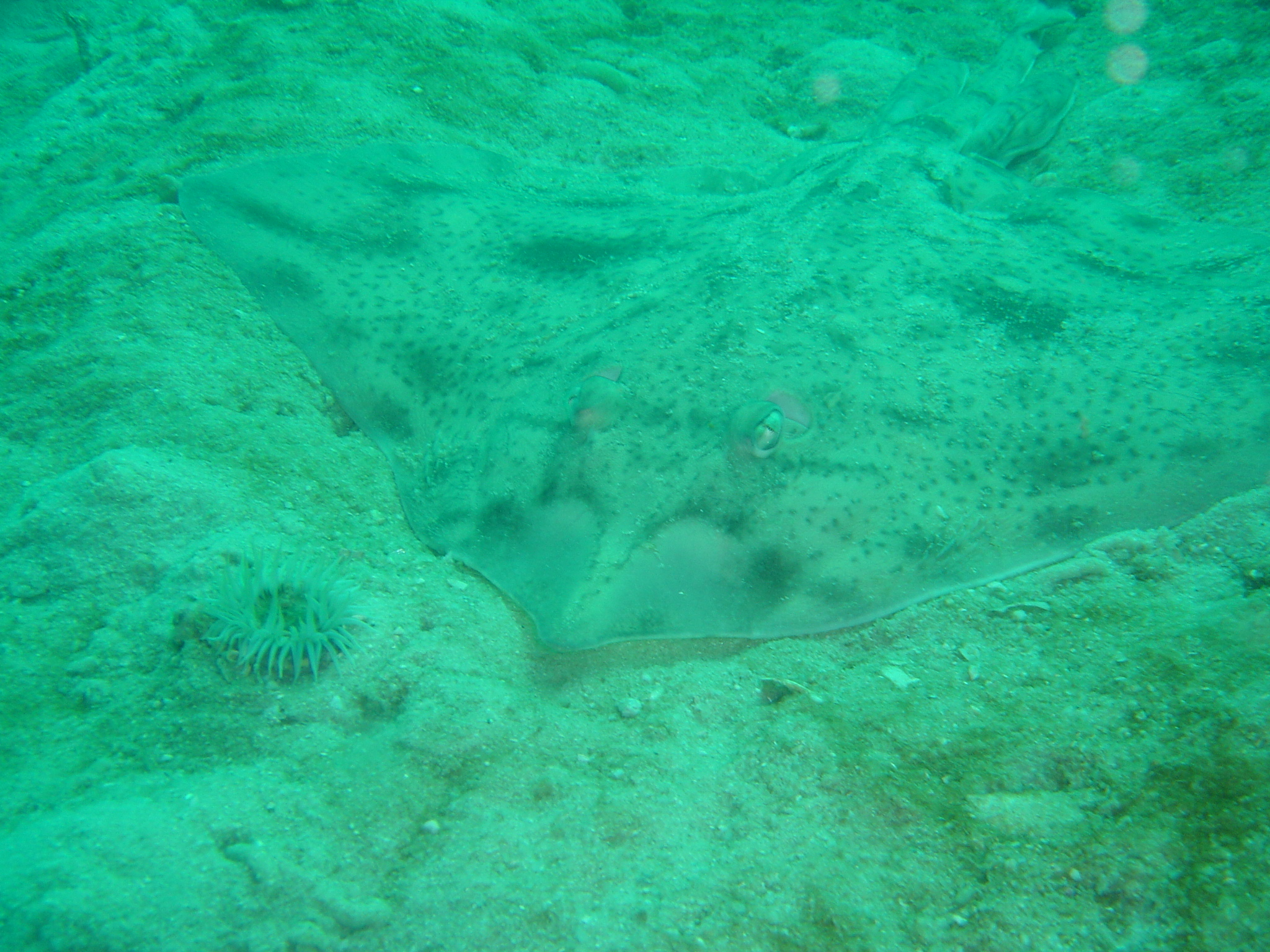

Conservation status
- Near Threatened (IUCN 3.1)

Scientific classification
- Kingdom: Animalia
- Phylum: Chordata
- Class: Chondrichthyes
- Subclass: Elasmobranchii
- Order: Rajiformes
- Family: Rajidae
- Genus: Raja
- Species: R. straeleni

Binomial name
- Raja straeleni (Poll, 1951)

= Raja straeleni =

Species of cartilaginous fish

Raja straeleni, the biscuit skate, false thornback skate, or spotted skate, is a species of marine fish in the skate family (family Rajidae) of order Rajiformes. It is native to the eastern Atlantic Ocean.

== Description ==
This skate has a blunt, angular snout, a long, thick tail, and a broad flattened angular disc with wing-like pectoral fins. They reach a disc width of up to 68 cm (27 in) and are a light brown in colour with black spots, whorls and rosettes. The pectoral fins also have a dark brown eye spot near the base, although these are absent in juveniles. The upper side of the body is covered in many thornlike spines, with a row of strong thorns along the back and down the tail. Larger individuals may also have thorns on the white underside.

== Distribution and habitat ==
This species is found in the eastern Atlantic, from Rio de Oro in Western Sahara to South Africa. It is an oceanodromous marine demersal species. It is found from areas close inshore to a depth of 800 m (2,600 ft), although they are most common at depths of 100–300 m (330–980 ft). They prefer sandy areas and are found in shallow enclosed bays and on the continental slope.

== Ecology ==
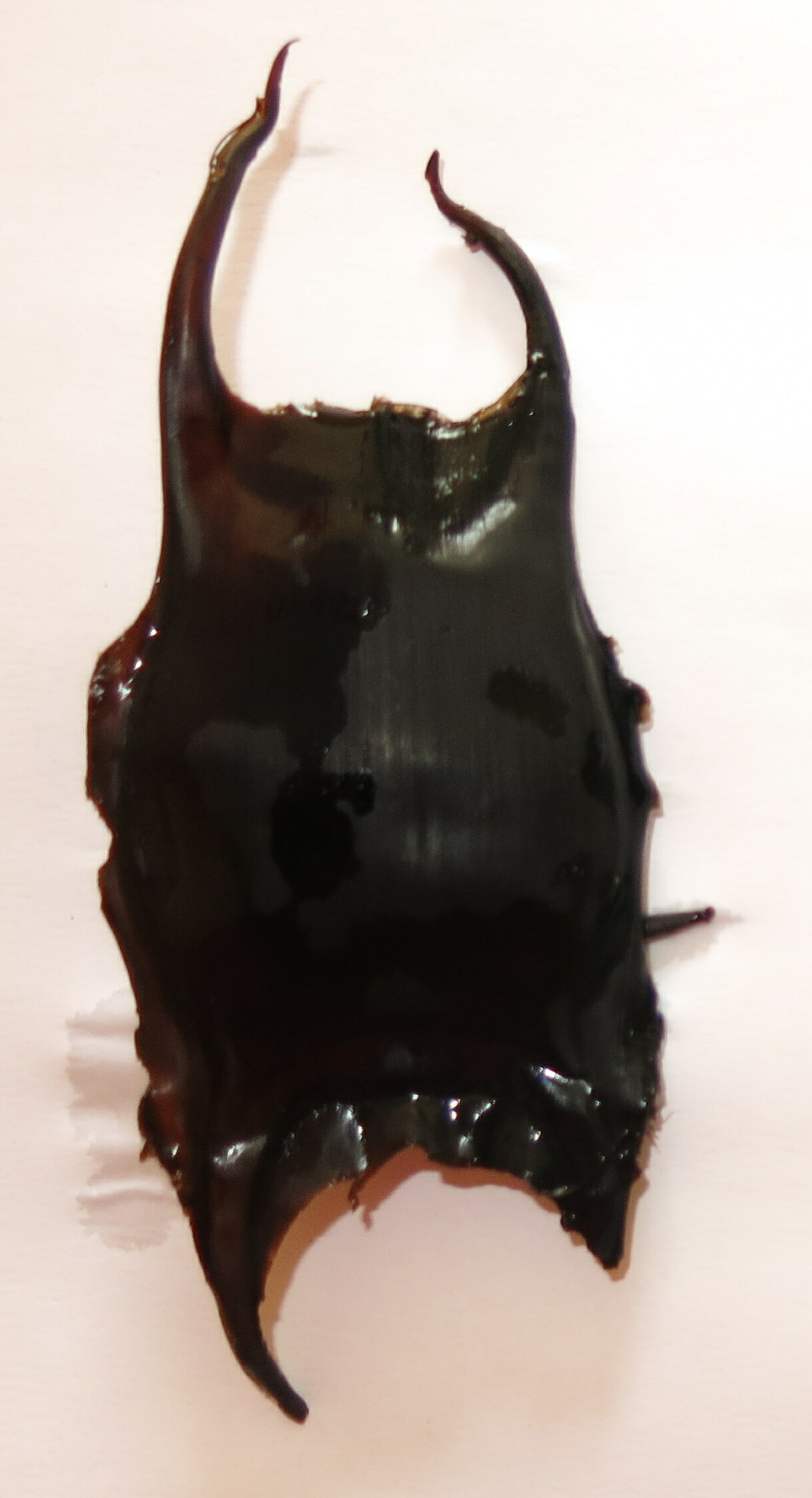
Raja straeleni eggcase

=== Behaviour ===
This skate migrates towards the coastal shallows during the warm season and towards deep waters in winter. They spend most of their time lying flat on the sand, where they are well camouflaged.

=== Diet ===
This skate feeds on invertebrates, including crustaceans, bony fishes and fish offal.

=== Reproduction ===
This species is oviparous: The egg cases are dark brown and have horn-like projections on the shell.

== Etymology ==
Raja: Latin, raja, -ae = a sting ray; straeleni: Named after V. Van Straelen, director of IRSNB, Belgium.

== Importance to humans ==
This species is caught by commercial fisheries and as a gamefish. It is caught by shore and ski-boat anglers and by hake trawlers. The pectoral fins sold as 'skate wings'.

== Conservation ==
This species is classified as being near threatened by the IUCN. While population data in South Africa seem to indicate that the population is stable in the region, there is intense unmanaged fishing in the northern parts of its range. This, coupled with the deceased landings and the fishery range expansions that have stemmed from depleting fish stocks, suggests that it has declined massively in parts of its range due to exploitation This is exasperated by its slow rate of reproduction.
