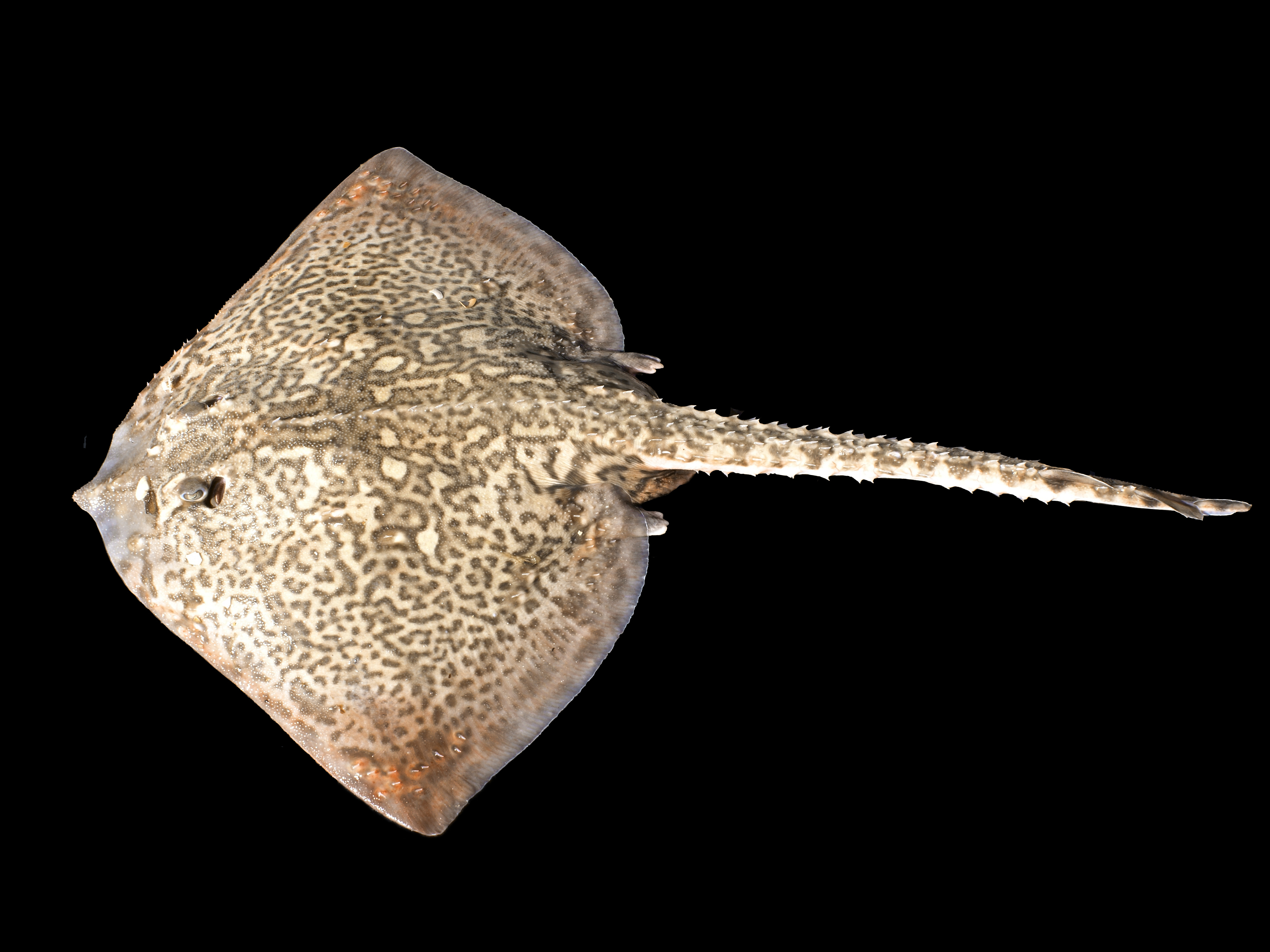
- Raja clavata

Scientific classification
- Kingdom: Animalia
- Phylum: Chordata
- Class: Chondrichthyes
- Subclass: Elasmobranchii
- Order: Rajiformes
- Family: Rajidae
- Genus: Raja; Linnaeus, 1758

Type species
- Raja miraletus Linnaeus, 1758

Species
- See text

= Raja (fish) =

Raja Temporal range: 70–0 Ma Maastrichtian to Present

Genus of cartilaginous fishes

Raja, also known as Raia, is a genus of skates in the family Rajidae containing 16 species. Formerly a wastebasket genus, many species historically categorized here have been moved to other genera in the family, such as Amblyraja, Beringraja, Dipturus, Leucoraja and Rostroraja. Raja are flat-bodied, cartilaginous fish with rhombic shapes due to their large pectoral fins extending from or near from the snouts to the bases of their tails. Their sharp snouts are produced by a cranial projection of rostral cartilage. The mouth and gills are located on the underside of the body. They may be either solid-coloured or patterned, and most skates have spiny or thornlike structures on the upper surface, while some species contain weak electrical organs within their tails. Mating typically occurs in the spring and the female lays numerous eggs per clutch which are encapsulated in leathery cases, commonly known as "mermaid’s purses". Species vary in size, ranging from about 40 to 140 cm (1.3–4.6 ft) in length. These bottom-dwellers are active during both day and night, and typically feed on molluscs, crustaceans and fish. Raja skates are found in the East Atlantic, also in the Mediterranean, and western Indian Ocean, ranging from relatively shallow water to a depth of 800 m (2,600 ft). Skates and related species have fossil records dating from the Upper Cretaceous period, thus this well-adapted lineage is quite ancient.

== Species ==
There are currently 16 species in this genus:

- Raja asterias Delaroche, 1809 (Mediterranean starry ray)
- Raja brachyura Lafont, 1873 (blonde ray)
- Raja clavata Linnaeus, 1758 (thornback ray)
- Raja herwigi G. Krefft, 1965 (Cape Verde skate)
- Raja maderensis R. T. Lowe, 1838 (Madeiran ray)
- Raja mauritaniensis White & Fricke, 2021 (African ray)
- Raja microocellata Montagu, 1818 (small-eyed ray)
- Raja miraletus Linnaeus, 1758 (brown ray)
- Raja montagui Fowler, 1910 (spotted ray)
- Raja ocellifera Regan, 1906
- Raja parva Last & Séret, 2016 (African brown skate)
- Raja pita Fricke & Al-Hassan, 1995 (pita ray)
- Raja polystigma Regan, 1923 (speckled ray)
- Raja radula Delaroche, 1809 (rough ray)
- Raja straeleni Poll, 1951 (spotted skate)
- Raja undulata Lacépède, 1802 (undulate ray)

== See also ==
- List of prehistoric cartilaginous fish
