= Egg case (Chondrichthyes) =

Natural collagen casing found encompassing some aquatic lifeforms' fertilized eggs

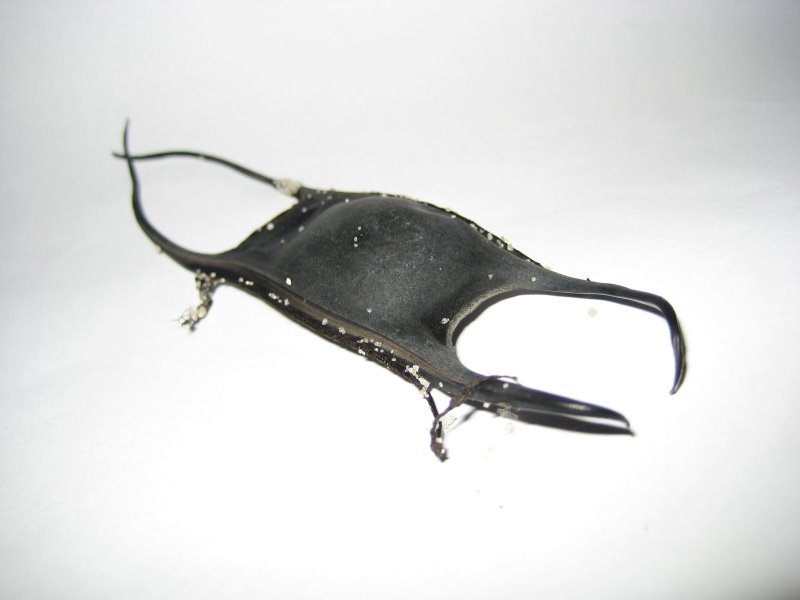
Egg case of a skate

Embryo active inside egg case

An egg case or egg capsule, often colloquially called a mermaid's purse, is the casing that surrounds the eggs of oviparous chondrichthyans. Living chondricthyans that produce egg cases include some sharks, skates and chimaeras. Egg cases typically contain one embryo, except for big skate and mottled skate egg cases, which contain up to seven embryos. Oviparity is completely absent in the superorder Squalomorphi. Egg cases are also thought to have been produced by some extinct chondrichthyan groups, such as hybodonts and xenacanths.

== Description ==
Egg cases are made of collagen protein strands, and are often described as feeling rough and leathery. Some egg cases have a fibrous material covering the outside of the egg case, thought to aid in attachment to substrate. Egg cases without a fibrous outer layer can be striated, bumpy, or smooth and glossy. With the exception of bullhead shark eggs, egg cases are typically rectangular in shape with projections, called horns, at each corner. Depending on the species, egg cases may have one or more tendrils.

== Development ==
Shortly after internal fertilization, the fertilized ovum enters the partially formed egg case located in the oviduct. After the ovum enters, the rest of the egg case forms around it. Shortly after the egg case finishes developing, it is deposited outside the body; common locations include kelp forests and rocky seafloors. Egg cases are typically produced in pairs, each with one fertilized embryo inside, with the exception of a few species that produce egg cases with more than one viable embryo.

Gestation can take anywhere from a few months to over a year. After a period of development, typically a week or two, small slits open on each side of the egg case to aid water flow. The embryo fans its tail constantly to promote exchange with surrounding water.

== Sharks ==
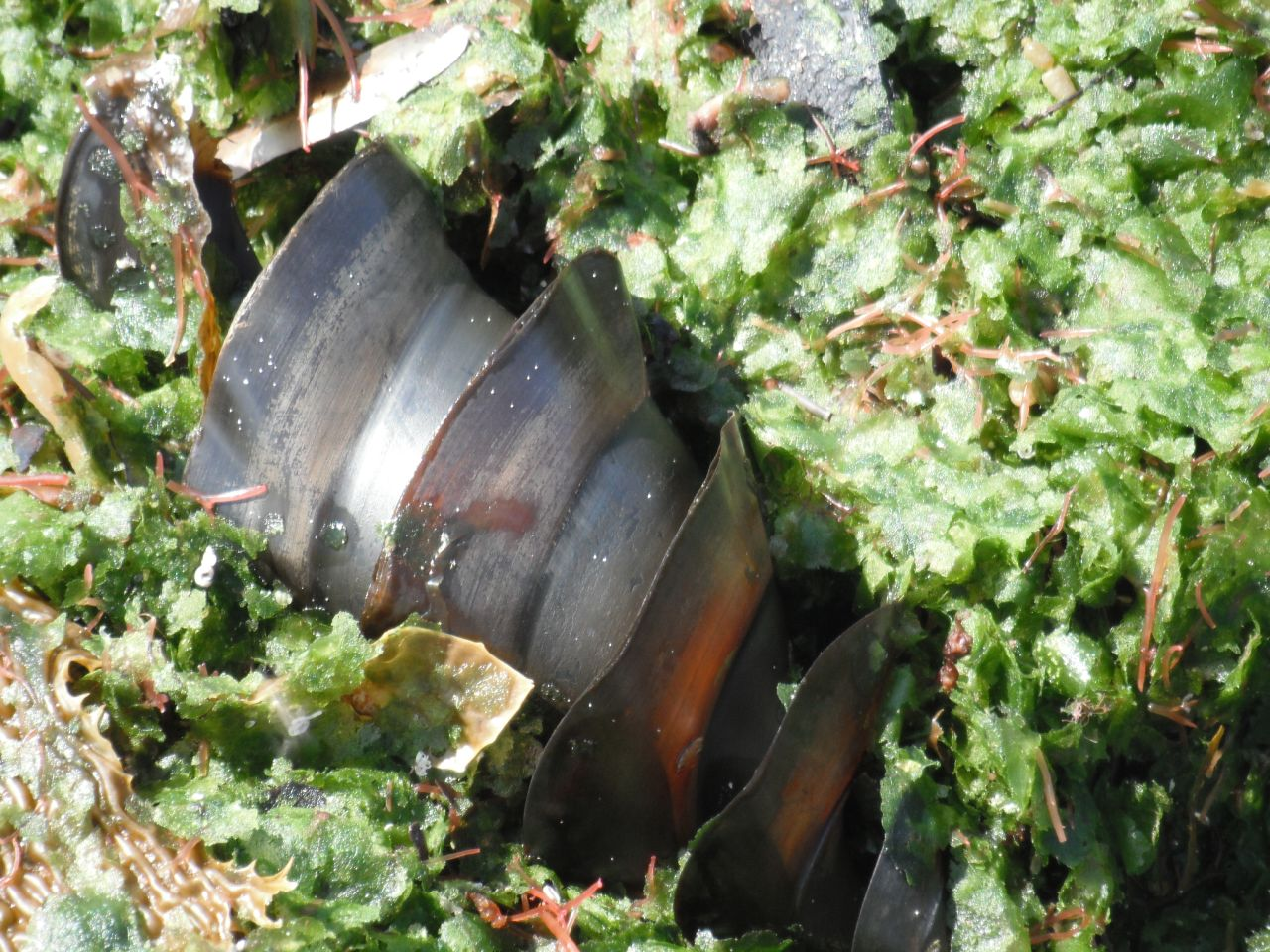
Egg case of a Port Jackson shark

Oviparity in sharks can be categorized as single or retained. With single oviparity, the egg cases are extruded soon after fertilization. With retained oviparity, eggs are kept within the oviduct for a period of time before depositing outside of the body as an unhatched egg case. It is thought that viviparity is the ancestral condition for sharks, and that it evolved through the elongation of retention time of retained oviparity.

Oviparous sharks are known to regularly produce unfertilized eggs when kept in captivity without males.

=== Bullhead sharks ===
Bullhead shark egg cases are shaped like an auger, with two spiral flanges. This allows the egg cases to become wedged in the crevices of rocky sea floors, where the eggs are protected from predators; however, some bullhead sharks deposit their eggs on sponges or seaweed. Hatchlings are considered large for sharks, reaching over 14 cm in length by the time they leave the egg case. Bullhead shark eggs typically hatch after 7 to 12 months, depending on the species. The female Japanese bullhead shark has been known to deposit their eggs in one location along with other females, called a "nest". The egg case of the Mexican hornshark features a tendril and more rigid flanges, suggesting that egg case design of this species is evolving towards anchoring with tendrils and away from wedging into crevices. As a member of the order Heterodontiformes, the whitespotted bullhead sharks is thought to be oviparous, but egg cases have never been observed.

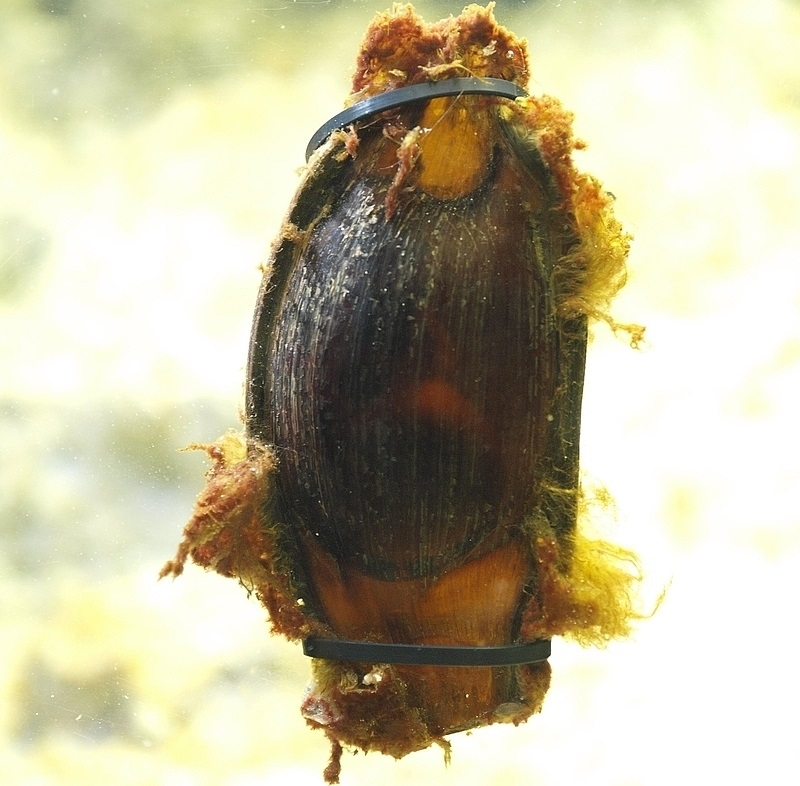
Egg case of a brownbanded bamboo shark

=== Carpet sharks ===
The bamboo sharks (Hemiscylliidae) and the zebra shark (Stegostomatidae) lay eggs on the bottom, while the other carpet sharks give live birth. The egg cases are oval and covered with adhesive fibers that serve to secure them to the bottom.

=== Ground sharks ===
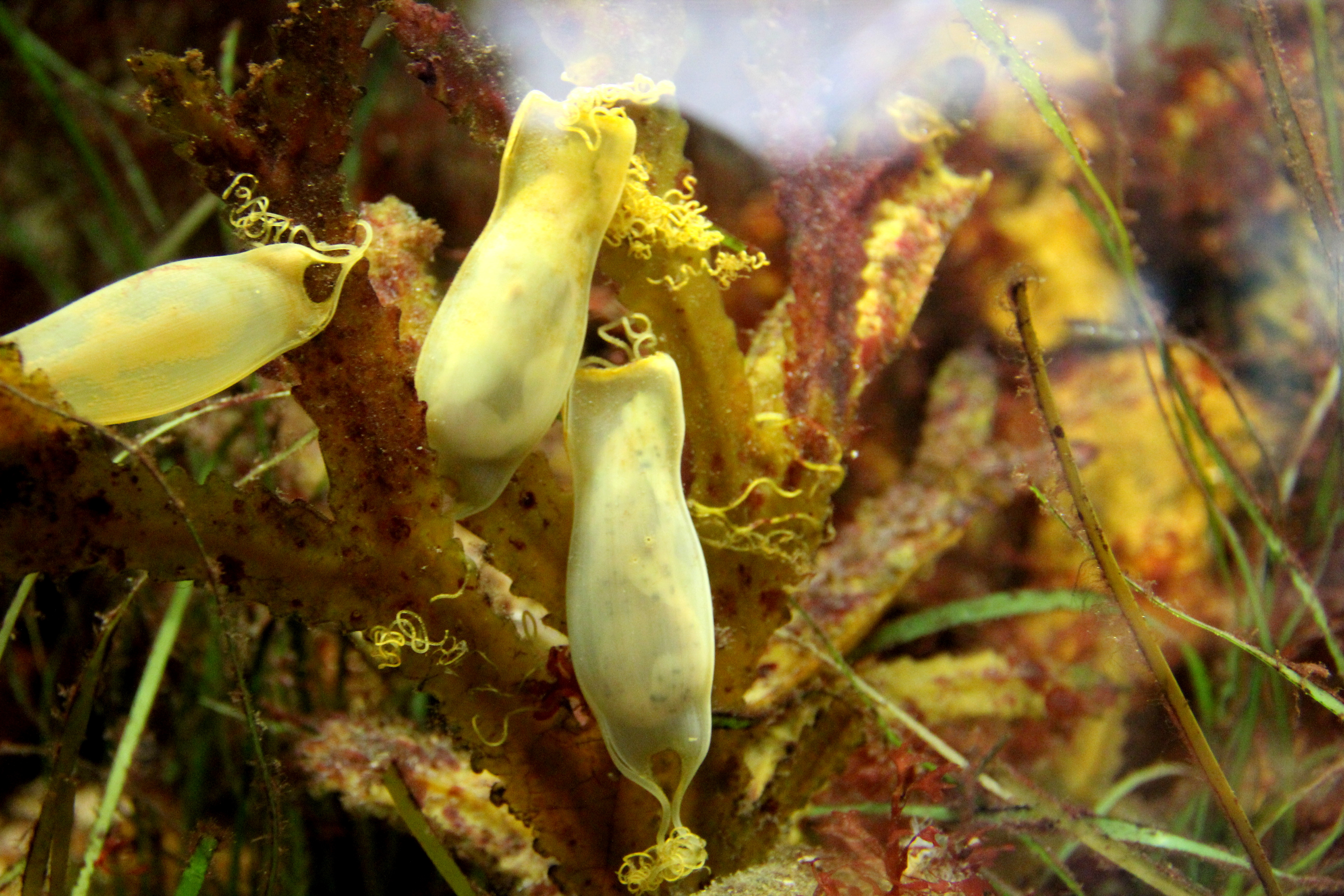
Egg cases of a catshark

Some catsharks (Scyliorhinidae) and the finback catsharks in the genus Proscyllium are the only members of their order that lay eggs. The egg cases of catsharks are purse-shaped with long tendrils at the corners that serve to anchor them to structures on the sea floor.

The size of egg cases vary; those of the small-spotted catshark or lesser spotted dogfish, Scyliorhinus canicula, are around 5 centimetres (2 in) long, while those of the greater spotted dogfish, S. stellaris, are around 10 centimetres (4 in). That excludes the four long tendrils found in each corner, which assist in anchorage. Egg cases from rays vary in that they have points rather than tendrils. The colours and shapes of egg cases also vary greatly from species to species.

== Skates ==
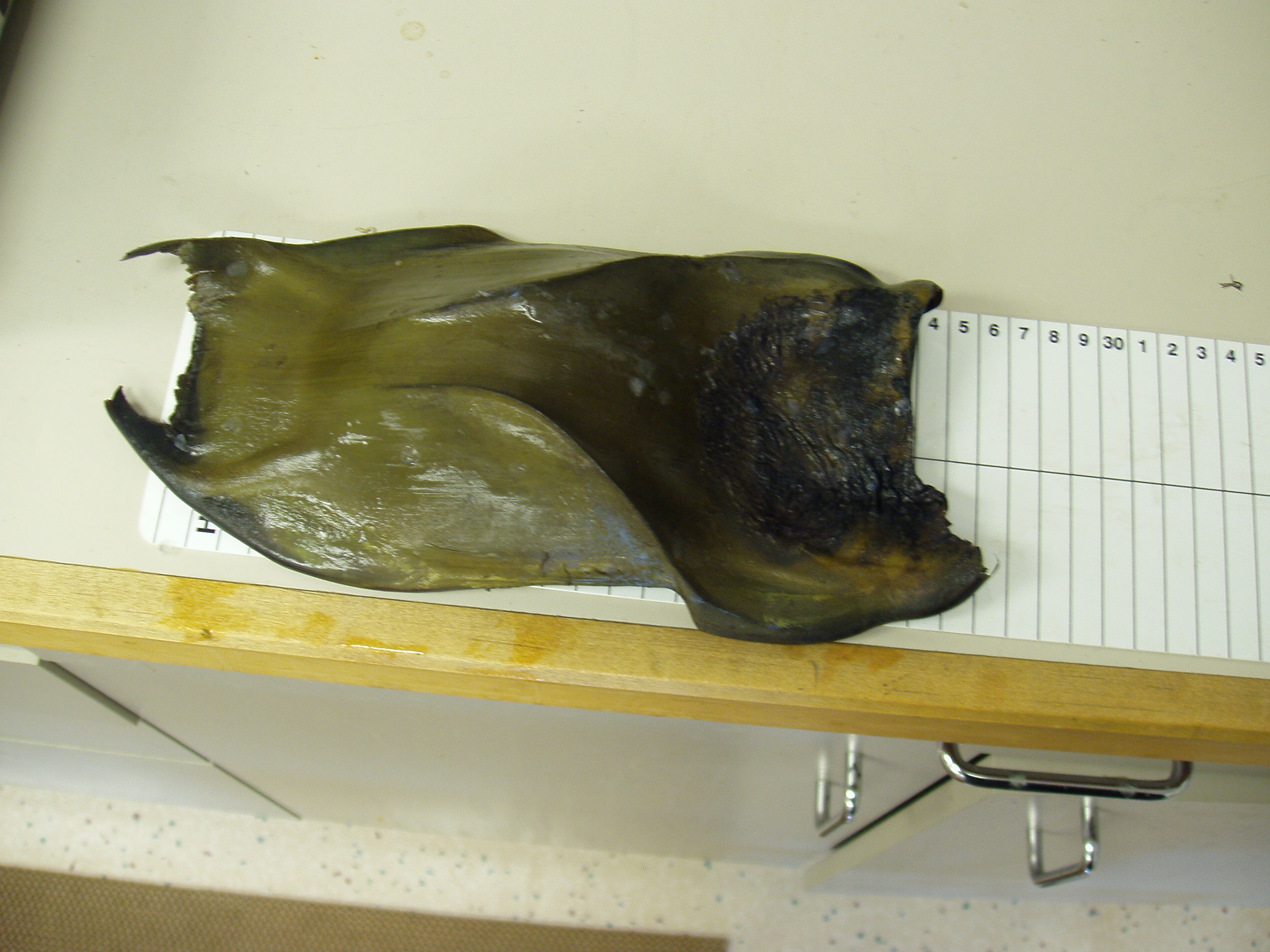
Egg case of a big skate

The skates (Rajidae, Arhynchobatidae, Anacanthobatidae) are the only rays that are oviparous. Females lay egg cases onto the sea floor after fertilization occurs in utero. While in utero, a protected case forms around the embryo which is called the egg case. Studies have been done where egg cases were removed from gravid females to ensure proper identification in regard to skate species. Egg cases have distinguishable characteristic traits that are unique to that species, thus making it a great tool for identifying a skate. The two most distinguishable features on the egg case are the keel and the absence or presence of a fibrous covering. A keel runs laterally along both sides of the outer edge of the egg case; it is a flexible structure. Keels will also run the length of the horns on some skate species. Some egg cases have broad keels (greater than 10% of the maximum egg case width) while others have narrow keels (less than 10% of the maximum egg case width). Many egg cases are covered with a layer of fiber; some will have a fine layer while others have a thick layer.

=== Big skate ===
Big skate egg cases are larger than most other skate egg cases; typically ranging from 210 to 280 mm in length and 110 to 180 mm in width. Big skates egg cases are approximately 15% of the overall length of the female skate. The egg case is very smooth and lacks external fibrous material. This egg case can be easily identified from all others in that it is the only one to have a steep ridge, giving the case a convex shape. The keel on the egg case is considered very broad, representing 30–33% of the width of the egg case.

Big skates are one of only two skates known to have multiple embryos inside an egg case; up to 7 embryos have been found inside a single case. But most big skate egg cases contain 3–4 embryos.

=== Longnose skate ===
The longnose skate, Raja rhina, is considered a larger skate species; reaching a maximum size range of 145 cm total length. Although their egg cases are smaller than that of the big skate, their cases are also considered large; ranging 93–102 mm in length. Egg cases contain a single embryo. Longnose skate egg cases found in the field are brown in color. The external side is covered with a fibrous material, which is thicker on the top side and thinner on the bottom side of the case. The case is smooth underneath the fibrous material.

== Chimaeras ==
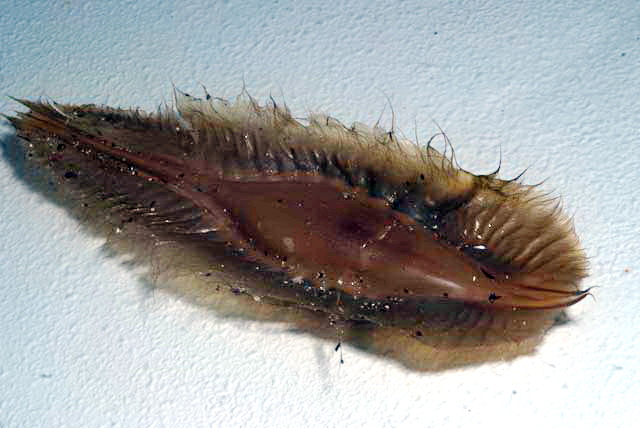
Egg case of a Cape elephantfish

All known chimaeras produce egg cases. The egg cases of chimaeras are spindle- or bottle-shaped with fins on the sides. They are laid on the bottom of the sea floor. Chimaeras (subclass Holocephali), some sharks, and skates are among the 43% of known Chondrichthian species to exhibit oviparity. However, there are some key morphological differences that are specific to chimaeras. The holocephalan egg capsule, or egg case, has a bulbous center flanked laterally by flattened collagen tissue. The flattened collagen tissue joins on the anterior end of the egg capsule to form a tail. Sharp projections located on the anterior and posterior end of the egg case serve to better secure the egg case in between rocks, as well as protection against potential predators.

== Extinct chondrichthyans ==
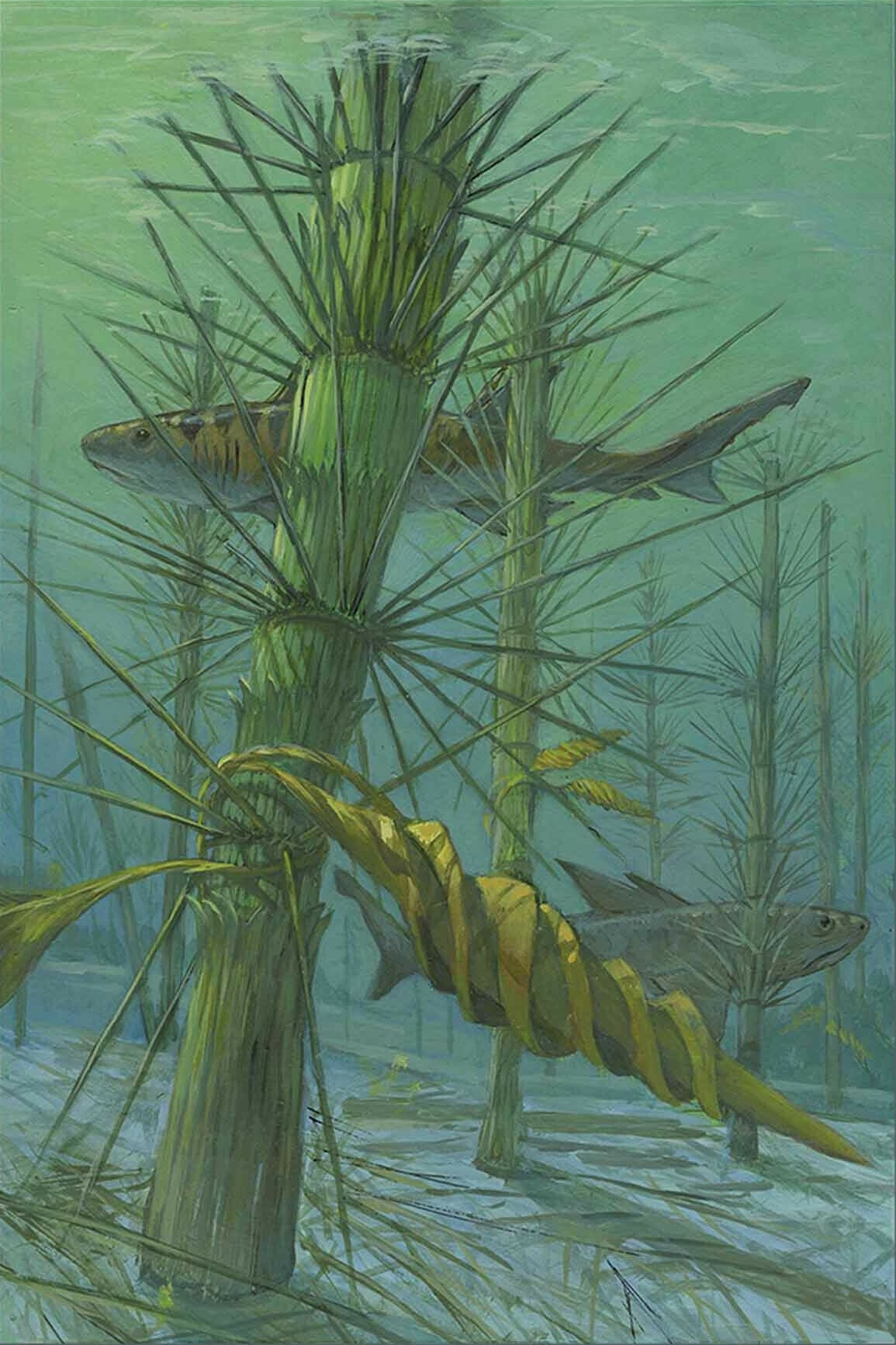
Illustration of an Early Jurassic estuarine ecosystem, with Palaeoxyris egg cases attached via tendril to Neocalamites stems, with hybodonts in the background

The egg case genera Palaeoxyris and Fayolia, which are thought to have been produced by hybodonts and xenacanths respectively, two groups of extinct shark-like cartilaginous fish more closely related to modern sharks and rays than to chimaeras, resemble those of bulldog sharks in having a spiral collarettes running around them. Both Palaeoxyris and Fayolia taper towards their ends (with the tapering being more pronounced in Palaeoxyris), with one end having a tendril. Unlike modern sharks, these eggs are typically found in freshwater environments.

== Threats ==
Predation on egg cases is thought to be a major source of mortality for developing oviparous sharks, skates and chimaeras. In general, predation is the leading cause of mortality for marine fish eggs, due to their abundance and high nutritional value. Parental care ends when the egg case is released from the body, so the embryo relies on its tough, leathery exterior as its only source of protection. Some gastropods are known to feed on egg cases by boring into the exterior. Sharks are also common predators of egg cases.
