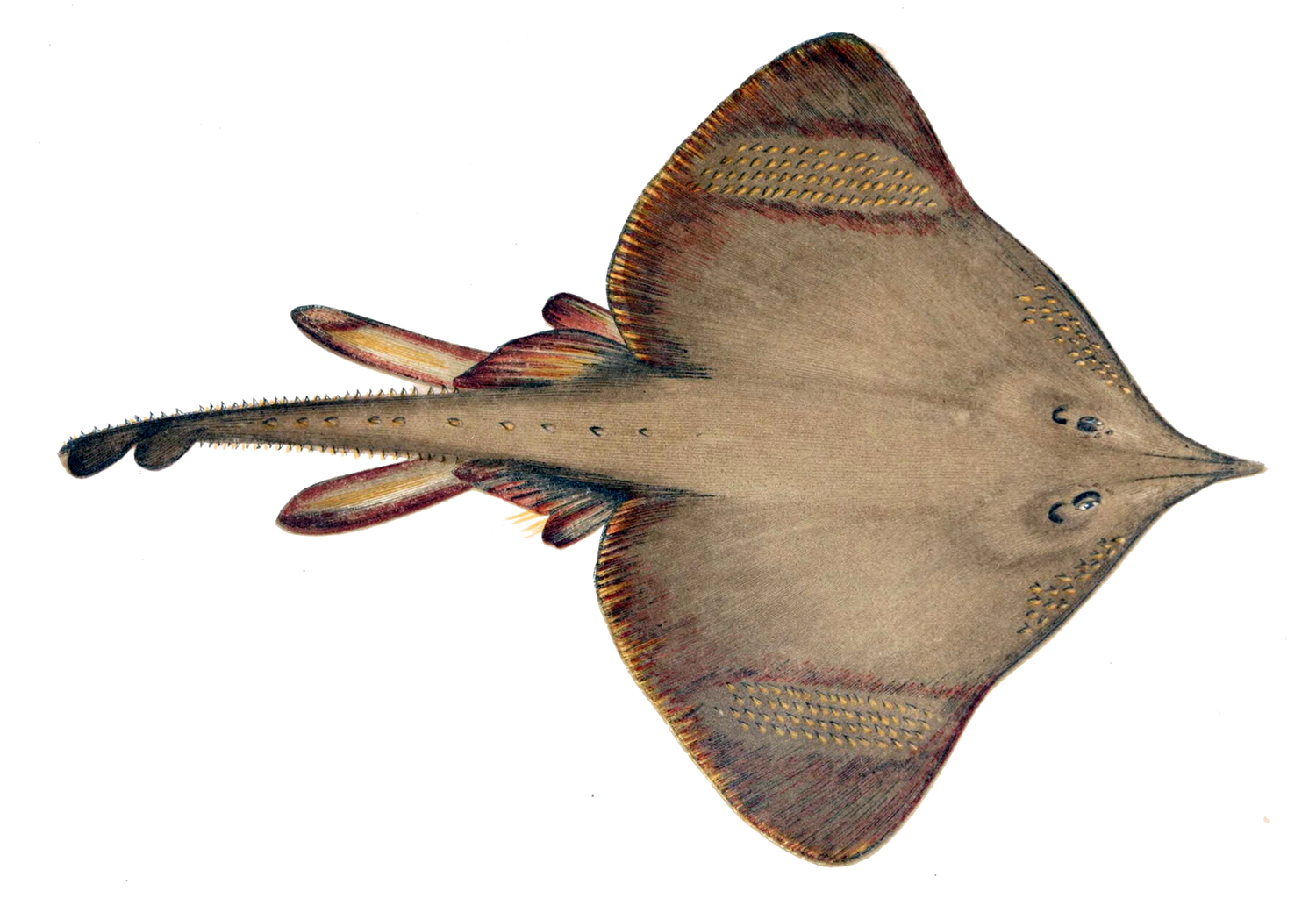
- Long-nosed skate (D. oxyrinchus) ♂

Scientific classification
- Kingdom: Animalia
- Phylum: Chordata
- Class: Chondrichthyes
- Subclass: Elasmobranchii
- Order: Rajiformes
- Family: Rajidae
- Genus: Dipturus; Rafinesque, 1810

Type species
- Raja batis Linnaeus, 1758

= Dipturus =

Genus of cartilaginous fishes

Dipturus is a large genus of skates native to the Pacific, Atlantic, and Indian Oceans. They were formerly included in Raja. Some species initially moved to Dipturus were later placed in Dentiraja, Spiniraja, and Zearaja.

== Species ==
Currently, 39 recognized species are placed in this genus:

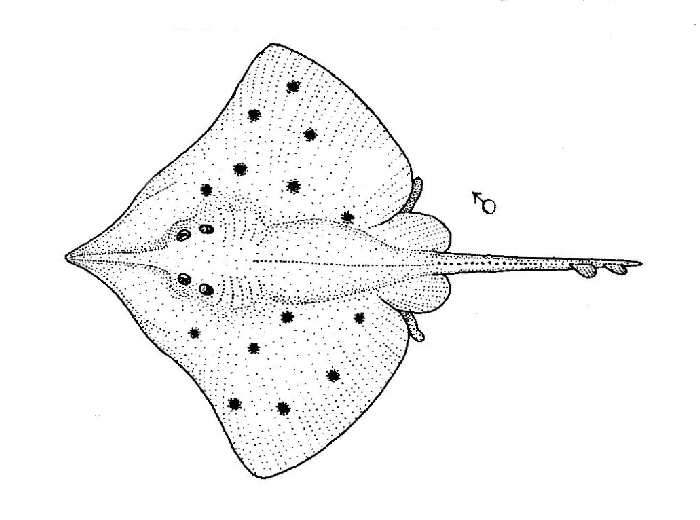
Dipturus innominatus

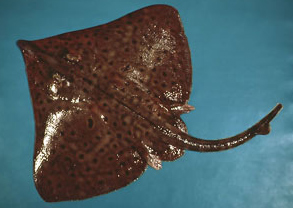
Dipturus laevis

- Dipturus acrobelus Last, W. T. White & Pogonoski, 2008 (deepwater skate)
- Dipturus amphispinus Last & Alava, 2013 (Ridgeback skate)
- Dipturus apricus Last, W. T. White & Pogonoski, 2008 (pale tropical skate)
- Dipturus batis (Linnaeus, 1758) (common skate or blue skate)
- Dipturus bullisi (Bigelow & Schroeder, 1962) (Bullis skate)
- Dipturus campbelli (J. H. Wallace, 1967) (blackspot skate)
- Dipturus canutus Last, 2008 (grey skate)
- Dipturus chinensis (Basilewsky, 1855) (Chinese skate)
- Dipturus crosnieri (Séret, 1989) (Madagascar skate)
- Dipturus doutrei (Cadenat, 1960) (violet skate)
- Dipturus ecuadoriensis (Beebe & Tee-Van, 1941) (Ecuador skate)
- Dipturus garricki (Bigelow & Schroeder, 1958) (San Blas skate)
- Dipturus gigas (Ishiyama, 1958) (giant skate)
- Dipturus grahamorum Last, 2008 (Graham's skate)
- Dipturus gudgeri (Whitley, 1940) (greenback skate)
- Dipturus innominatus (Garrick & Paul, 1974) (New Zealand smooth skate)
- Dipturus intermedius (Parnell, 1837) (flapper skate)
- Dipturus johannisdavisi (Alcock, 1899) (Travancore skate)
- Dipturus kwangtungensis (Y. T. Chu, 1960) (Kwangtung skate)
- Dipturus laevis (Mitchill, 1818) (barndoor skate)
- Dipturus lamillai (Concha, Caira, Ebert & Pompert, 2019) (warrah skate)
- Dipturus lanceorostratus (J. H. Wallace, 1967) (rattail skate)
- Dipturus leptocauda (G. Krefft & Stehmann, 1975) (thintail skate)
- Dipturus macrocauda (Ishiyama, 1955) (bigtail skate)
- Dipturus melanospilus Last, W. T. White & Pogonoski, 2008 (blacktip skate)
- Dipturus mennii U. L. Gomes & Paragó, 2001 (South Brazilian skate)
- Dipturus nidarosiensis (Storm, 1881) (Norwegian skate)
- Dipturus olseni ([Bigelow & Schroeder, 1951) (spreadfin skate)
- Dipturus oregoni (Bigelow & Schroeder, 1958) (hooktail skate)
- Dipturus oxyrinchus (Linnaeus, 1758) (longnosed skate)
- Dipturus pullopunctatus (J. L. B. Smith, 1964) (slime skate)
- Dipturus queenslandicus Last, W. T. White & Pogonoski, 2008 (Queensland deepwater skate)
- Dipturus springeri (J. H. Wallace, 1967) (roughbelly skate)
- Dipturus stenorhynchus (J. H. Wallace, 1967) (prownose skate)
- Dipturus teevani (Bigelow & Schroeder, 1951) (prickly brown ray)
- Dipturus tengu (D. S. Jordan & Fowler, 1903) (acutenose skate)
- Dipturus trachyderma (G. Krefft & Stehmann, 1975) (roughskin skate)
- Dipturus wengi Séret & Last, 2008 (Weng's skate)
- Dipturus wuhanlingi Jeong & Nakabo, 2008 (Wu's skate)
