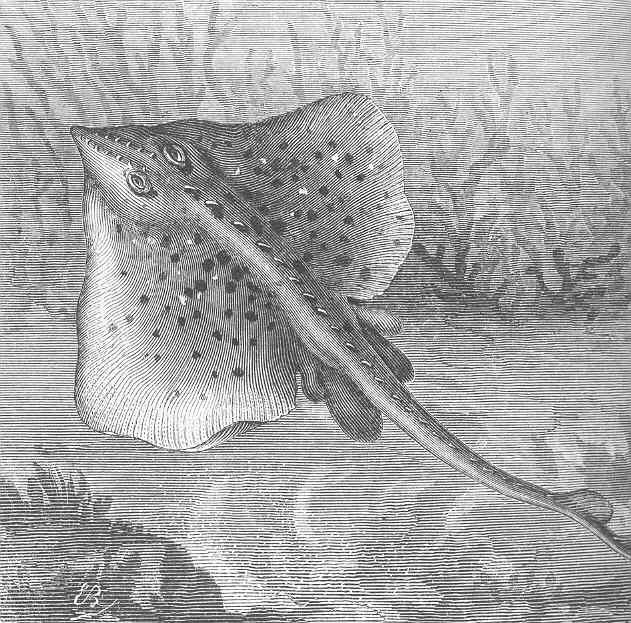

Conservation status
- Critically Endangered (IUCN 3.1)

Scientific classification
- Kingdom: Animalia
- Phylum: Chordata
- Class: Chondrichthyes
- Subclass: Elasmobranchii
- Order: Rajiformes
- Family: Rajidae
- Genus: Dipturus
- Species: D. batis

Binomial name
- Dipturus batis (Linnaeus, 1758)

Synonyms
- Raja batis Linnaeus, 1758; Raja macrorynchus Rafinesque, 1810; Propterygia hyposticta Otto, 1821; Raja flossada Risso, 1827; Raia gaimardi Gaimard, 1851; Batis vulgaris Couch, 1862

= Blue skate =

Species of cartilaginous fish

The blue skate (Dipturus batis), also known as the grey skate, blue-grey skate, and common skate, is a species of cartilaginous fish, a ray, belonging to the family Rajidae, the skates. It was formerly considered to be conspecific with the flapper skate (D. intermedius), the combined taxon being known as the common skate. Historically, it was one of the most abundant skates in the northeast Atlantic Ocean and the Mediterranean Sea. Despite its name, today it appears to be absent from much of this range. Where previously abundant, fisheries directly targeted this skate and elsewhere it is caught incidentally as bycatch. The former species was uplisted to critically endangered on the IUCN Red List in 2006 and it is protected within the EU.

Research published in 2009 and 2010 showed that the common skate should be split into two, the smaller southern D. cf. flossada (blue skate), and the larger northern D. cf. intermedius (flapper skate). Under this taxonomic arrangement, the name D. batis is recommended to be discarded. Currently, the scientific name D. batis (with flossada as a synonym) is retained for the blue skate and D. intermedius for the flapper skate.

== Taxonomy ==
The blue skate was first formally described as Raja batis in the 10th edition of Systema Naturae by Carl Linnaeus published in 1758 with its type locality given as "European Seas, locations being given as England and Lesbos. In 1810 Constantine Samuel Rafinesque proposed a new subgenus of Raja which he called Dipturus with R. batis as its only species, the blue skate is the type species of Dipturus by monotypy. The genus Dpturus belongs to the family Rajidae which is classified within the order Rajiformes.

Distinct genetic and morphological differences exist within the common skate as traditionally defined, leading to the recommendation of splitting it into two species: The smaller (up to about 1.45 m or 4.8 ft in length) southern D. cf. flossada (blue skate), and the larger and slower-growing northern D. cf. intermedius (flapper skate). Under this taxonomic arrangement, the name D. batis is discarded. Alternatively, the scientific name D. batis (with flossada as a synonym) is retained for the blue skate and D. intermedius for the flapper skate. A formal request of preserving the name D. batis (with flossada as a synonym) for the blue skate has been submitted to the International Commission on Zoological Nomenclature, but as of 2017 a decision is still pending.

Based on molecular phylogenetics, D. cf. intermedius is very close to D. oxyrinchus, while the relationship to D. cf. flossada is more distant.

D. cf. intermedius has dark olive-green eyes and the blotch on each wing consists of a group of pale spots. D. cf. flossada has pale yellow eyes, and the blotch on each wing is relatively large, roughly round, dark and with a pale ring around it. Additional differences between the two are found in the thorns on their tails and other morphometric features. Both are found around the British Isles, and their ranges broadly overlap in the seas around this archipelago, but D. cf. intermedius is the most frequent species in the northern half (off Scotland and Northern Ireland), and D. cf. flossada is the most frequent in the southwest (Celtic Sea) and at Rockall. The primary—possibly only—species in Ireland is D. cf. flossada based mainly on the ICES International Bottom Trawl Survey and zoological specimens, the species off Norway is D. cf. intermedius (no confirmed records of D. cf. flossada, but it might occur), and based on limited data the main in the North Sea, Skagerrak and Kattegat is D. cf. intermedius (although at least one record of D. cf. flossada in this region, off west Sweden, has been reported). Uncertainty exists about the exact species involved in the southern half of the range, but a preliminary morphological study indicates that the one in the Azores is D. cf. intermedius.

== Description ==
The blue skate can reach up to 1.43 m (4 ft 8 in) in length. Overall shape features a pointed snout and rhombic shape, with a row of spines or thorns along the tail. The top surface is generally coloured olive-grey to brown, often with a pattern of spots, and the underside is lighter blue-grey. The blue skate has a pointed and long snout and can have from 0-3 interdorsal thorns, though it is usually 1-2. It can be confused with several other skates in its range, such as D. nidarosiensis, D. oxyrinchus, and Rostroraja alba.

== Range, habitat, and ecology ==
The blue skate is native to the northeast Atlantic. It is a bottom dwelling species mainly found at depths of 100–200 m, but it can occur as shallow as 30 m and as deep as 1,000 m. Blue skates prefer seabeds with a soft substrate, but have been found to occur over gravel, cobble, and rocky seabeds. Now, their population and range are severely depleted and fragmented, with disappearances being reported on several places. This species is found in northeastern Atlantic from Norway and Iceland to Senegal. Its presence in the Mediterranean Sea is questionable since earlier records could concern D. intermedius recently considered as a distinct species.

== Growth and reproduction ==
The blue skate can reach an estimated age of 50–100 years and maturity is reached when about 11 years old. The size where they reach maturity depend on sex and population. In D. cf. flossada (blue skate) males reach maturity when about 1.15 m (3 ft 9 in) long and females when about 1.23 m (4 ft 0 in) long. In D. cf. intermedia (flapper skate), males reach maturity when about 1.86 m (6 ft 1 in) long and females when about 1.98 m (6 ft 6 in) long. The sex ratio is 1:1, but this can vary depending on geography and season. When hatching, juveniles measure up to 22.3 cm (8 3/4 in) long. Once they have reached sexual maturity, they reproduce only every other year. They mate in the spring, and during the summer, females lay about 40 egg cases in sandy or muddy flats. The eggs develop for 2–5 months before hatching.

=== Egg case ===
Egg cases measure up to 25 cm (10 in) long, excluding the horns, and 15 cm (6 in) wide. They are covered in close-felted fibers and often wash up on the shore.

Egg case hunts have been done throughout the general distribution of the common skate. In the British Isles, egg cases were found only in northern Scotland and the north of Ireland. In the 19th and 20th centuries, egg cases were seen along the entire British coastline in high numbers, but now they are found only in a few areas.

== Diet ==
Like other skates, the blue skate is a bottom feeder. Its diet consists of crustaceans, clams, oysters, snails, bristle worms, cephalopods, and small to medium-sized fish (such as sand eel, flatfish, monkfish, catsharks, spurdog, and other skates). The size of the individual can affect its diet. Larger ones eat larger things like fish. The bigger the skate is, the more food will be needed to sustain its large body size. The activity level determines how much it eats; the more active it is, the more it eats. The blue skate does not feed only on creatures at the bottom of the ocean, as some do ascend to feed on mackerel, herring, and other pelagic fish, which are caught by rapidly moving up from the seabed to grab the prey.

== Threatened status ==
The blue skate is listed as a critically endangered species by the IUCN and it is threatened both in the Atlantic Ocean and Mediterranean Sea. The blue skate's population has drastically decreased because of overfishing and it likely will disappear entirely unless more is done to preserve it. It has both been targeted directly and caught incidentally as bycatch. Due to the profitability of trawl fishing, bycatch likely will remain a serious problem for the blue skate. The species is extirpated in the Baltic Sea. Remaining strongholds where it remains locally common are off western Scotland and in the Celtic Sea. A stronghold along the coast of Norway has been suggested, but recent studies indicate the species is rare there and many previous records are the result of misidentifications of other skates.

Because the blue skate is long-lived and slow to mature, it may be slow to repopulate, but experience with the related barndoor skate (D. laevis) of the northwest Atlantic indicates that a population recovery may be possible in a relatively short time. The blue skate is strictly protected within the EU, making it illegal for commercial fishers to actively fish for it or keep it if accidentally landed. Like other elasmobranchs, it is believed to have a good chance of surviving if released after being caught.
