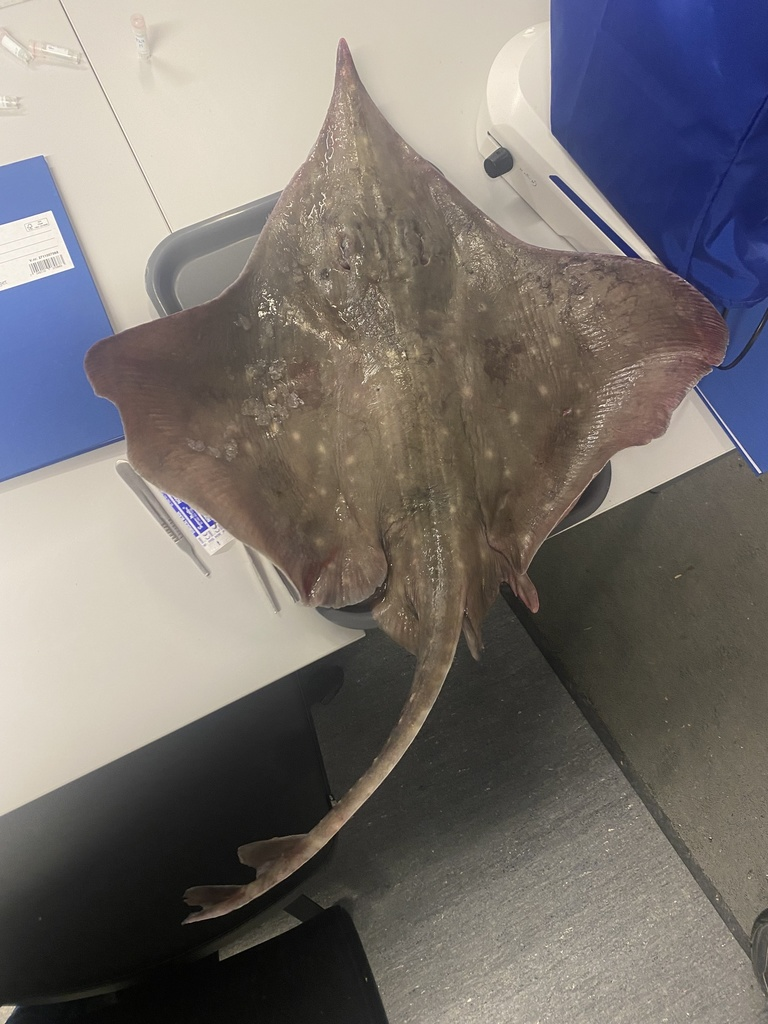

Conservation status
- Critically Endangered (IUCN 3.1)

Scientific classification
- Kingdom: Animalia
- Phylum: Chordata
- Class: Chondrichthyes
- Subclass: Elasmobranchii
- Order: Rajiformes
- Family: Rajidae
- Genus: Dipturus
- Species: D. intermedius

Binomial name
- Dipturus intermedius (Parnell, 1837)

Synonyms
- Raia intermedia Parnell, 1837; Raja intermedia Parnell, 1837

= Flapper skate =

Species of cartilaginous fish

The flapper skate (Dipturus intermedius) is a species of cartilaginous fish, a ray, belonging to the family Rajidae, the skates. It was formerly considered to be conspecific with the blue skate (D. batis), the combined taxon being known as the common skate. The flapper skate is found in the Eastern Atlantic Ocean, although its range has contracted to a considerable extent due to overfishing, and it is classified by the International Union for Conservation of Nature as Critically Endangered. It is the largest species of skate in the World.

== Taxonomy ==
The flapper skate was first formally described as Raia intermedia in 1837 by the British physician and naturalist Richard Parnell with its type locality given as the Firth of Forth, Scotland, the North Sea. Up to 2010 D. intermedius was regarded as a synonym of D. batis, in 2010 molecular studies confirmed that the flapper skate and the common or blue skate were two distinct species. Parnell obtained the holotypes from a fish market in Scotland and his line drawings and descriptions match juveniles of the flapper skate. The flapper skate belongs to the family Rajidae in the order Rajiformes.

== Etymology ==
The flapper skate belongs to the genus Dipturus, a name which combines di-, meaning "two", pterus, meaning "wing" or "fin", and urus, meaning tail. This name refers to the two dorsal fins on the tail of these skates. The specific name intermedius was given to the holotypes of this species by Parnell because these were intermediate in form between D. batis and D. oxyrinchus.

== Description ==
The flapper skate has a long and pointed snout, the length of the snout is between 3.7 and 5.1 times the diameter of the orbit. The disc is roughly rhomboidal in shape with a deeply concave front edge. There is a row of spines along the centre of the tail in front of the dorsal fins and the spines on the sides of the tail point headwards. Juveniles have a smooth disc. The distance between the wingtips is around 2.4 times the total length. The upper surface of the body is dark olive-green in young with small light-coloured spots, changing to greyish-brown in adults. The dorsal surface of the flapper skate lacks any thornlets or scattered thorns, though males have patches of alar thorns. Their upper jaw has 46 rows of teeth, while their lower jaw has 41 rows. The underside is greyish or whitish. In this species the iris is olive green. The flapper skate has a maximum published total length of 285 cm (112 in), and is the largest species of skate in the world, and a maximum published weight of 113 kg (249 lb).

== Distribution and habitat ==
The flapper skate occurs in the Eastern Atlantic Ocean, its range overlapping somewhat with that of the blue skate, with most records coming from southern Norway and off the northern coasts of Scotland and Ireland. There have been a few confirmed records from Portugal and the Azores. This species is a demersal fish found on the continental shelf and slope at depths between 20 and 1,500 m (66 and 4,921 ft), however, it is mainly found at depths of less than 200 m (660 ft).

== Biology ==
The flapper skate is demersal and feeds on soft substrates in deeper water, preying on crustaceans, other skates and small sharks. Larger flapper skates consumer more fishes than smaller individuals do. These skates take longer than ten years to attain sexual maturity and do not produce large numbers of young. They lay large eggs which are between 10 and 14 cm (3.9 and 5.5 in) wide and 13 and 23 cm (5.1 and 9.1 in) long, not including the horns, with a tough outer, protective coating. The eggs are laid in shallow areas where the seabed is made up of large pebbles and boulders and they take over a year to hatch. The hatchlings are around 2 cm (0.79 in) in length.

== Conservation ==
The flapper skate is assessed as Critically Endangered by the IUCN and there are indications that has been extirpated from some parts of its range, such as the southern North Sea. It was a valuable commercial fish and its flesh was esteemed and it was vulnerable to being taken in other fisheries, not targeting this species. It is now prohibited from being landed in the United Kingdom and the European Union, two polities which cover most of the remaining range of this species. In Scotland, this large species is a popular quarry for recreational anglers but angling is allowed only on a catch and release basis.
