= Leucia violacea =

Scientific classification
- Domain: Eukaryota
- Kingdom: Animalia
- Phylum: Annelida
- Clade: Pleistoannelida
- Subclass: Errantia
- Order: Phyllodocida
- Family: Polynoidae
- Genus: Leucia
- Species: L. violacea

Binomial name
- Leucia violacea (Storm, 1879)

Synonyms
- Evarne normani McIntosh, 1879; Harmothoe violacea (Storm, 1879); Laenilla violacea Storm, 1879

Species of annelid worm

Leucia violacea is a species of polychaete worm, commonly known as a "scale worm", in the family Polynoidae. This species occurs in the northeastern Atlantic Ocean.

== Description ==
The body has 42 segments which are concealed by sixteen pairs of elytra in two rows. The length of this worm is about 42 mm (1.7 in) and the width 9 mm (0.4 in). The prostomium has two lobes with a pair of acute anterior projections, a median antenna and a pair of lateral antennae inserted ventrally (beneath prostomium and median antenna), a pair of smooth palps and two pairs of eyes. The body is red to brown above and white beneath, and the scales are pink to violet. It can be distinguished from Leucia nivea , the only other member of the genus, by the microtubercles on the scales being all conical while the macrotubercles are scattered and indistinct. Notochaetae distinctly thicker than neurochaetae. Unidentate and bidentate neurochaetae are present.

== Taxonomy ==
This species was first described by the Norwegian zoologist Vilhelm Storm in 1879 as Laenilla violacea but was later transferred to the genus Harmothoe. During a revision of this genus in 2009, H. violacea was reassigned to Leucia violacea on the basis that members of Harmothoe have fifteen pairs of scales while members of Leucia have sixteen.

== Distribution and habitat ==
This species occurs in the northeastern Atlantic Ocean, its range extending from Norway to the Bay of Biscay at depths between 30 and 1,262 m (100 and 4,100 ft). It is found on hard substrates, often associated with cold water corals such as Lophelia pertusa and Madrepora oculata.
