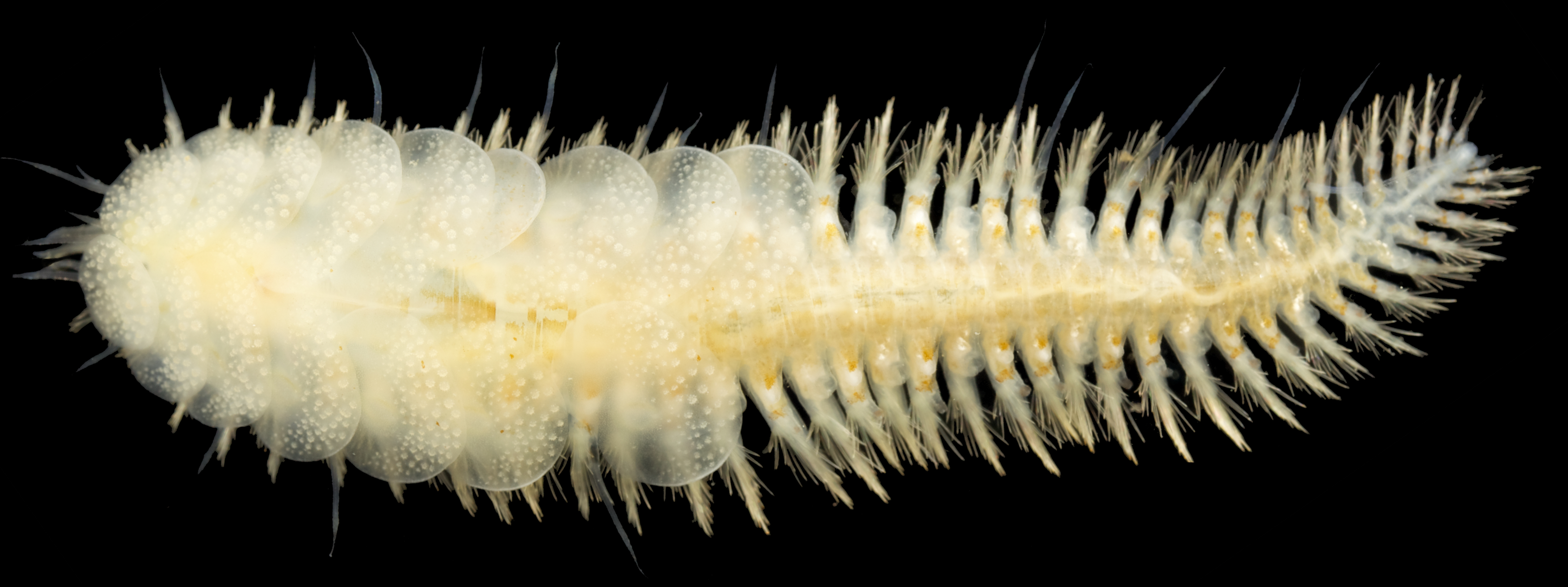

Scientific classification
- Kingdom: Animalia
- Phylum: Annelida
- Clade: Pleistoannelida
- Subclass: Errantia
- Order: Phyllodocida
- Family: Polynoidae
- Genus: Leucia
- Species: L. nivea

Binomial name
- Leucia nivea (M. Sars, 1863)

Synonyms
- Harmothoe echinopustulata Fauvel, 1913; Polynoe nivea M. Sars, 1863; Polynoe zonata Langerhans, 1880

= Leucia nivea =

Species of annelid worm

Leucia nivea is a species of polychaete worm, commonly known as a "scale worm", in the family Polynoidae. This species occurs in the northeastern Atlantic Ocean, the North Sea and the Mediterranean Sea.

== Description ==
This worm is yellowish with white scales and about 20 mm (0.8 in) long with 41 segments and 16 pairs of elytra. The prostomium bears 3 antennae, with a pair of lateral antennae inserted ventrally (beneath prostomium and the median antenna). The anterior margin of the prostomium has a pair of an acute anterior projections, a pair of palps and two pairs of eyes. The first segment bears one or two chaetae and a pair of tentacular cirri on both the dorsal and ventral surfaces. The notochaetae are distinctly thicker than the neurochaetae. Unidentate and bidentate neurochaetae are present.

== Taxonomy ==
This species was first described by the Norwegian zoologist Michael Sars in 1863 as Polynoe nivea but was later transferred to the genus Leucia which was established for it by the Finnish zoologist Anders Johan Malmgren in 1867. For a long time this was thought to be a monotypic taxon, but during a revision of the closely related genus Harmothoe, Harmothoe violacea was reassigned to Leucia violacea.

== Distribution ==
Leucia nivea occurs in the northeastern Atlantic Ocean, the North Sea as far north as the Skagerrak, the British Isles, southwards to the Azores and in the Mediterranean Sea. It is found in the sublittoral zone at depths down to about 400 m (1,312 ft) on sand, shelly gravel, sponges such as Desmacidona and cold water corals.
