= Blackspot skate =

Conservation status
- Near Threatened (IUCN 3.1)

Scientific classification
- Kingdom: Animalia
- Phylum: Chordata
- Class: Chondrichthyes
- Subclass: Elasmobranchii
- Order: Rajiformes
- Family: Rajidae
- Genus: Dipturus
- Species: D. campbelli

Binomial name
- Dipturus campbelli (J. H. Wallace, 1967)

Species of fish

The blackspot skate (Dipturus campbelli) is a species of fish in the family Rajidae. It is found off the south-eastern coast of Africa from Durban, South Africa to central Mozambique. Its natural habitat is open seas. It has a triangular snout, tail stout that is moderately smaller than its body, and small thorns on the nape and back. On the upper side of the fish it is medium grey or a brownish color with black spots and the underside has noticeably black spores.
