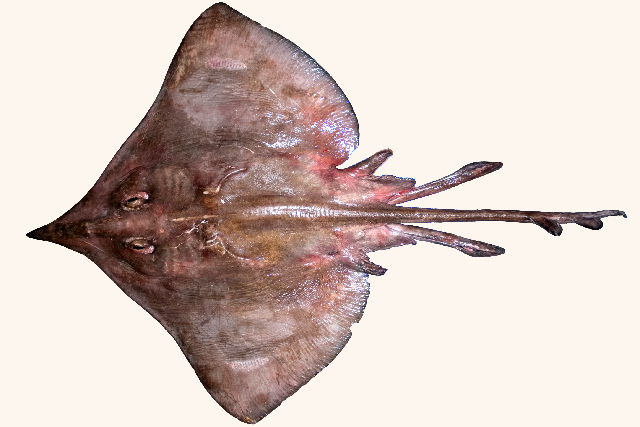

Conservation status
- Endangered (IUCN 3.1)

Scientific classification
- Kingdom: Animalia
- Phylum: Chordata
- Class: Chondrichthyes
- Subclass: Elasmobranchii
- Order: Rajiformes
- Family: Rajidae
- Genus: Dipturus
- Species: D. nidarosiensis

Binomial name
- Dipturus nidarosiensis (Storm, 1881)

Synonyms
- Raja nidarosiensis Storm, 1881 – basionym; Dipturus nidrosiensis (Storm, 1881) – misspelling; Raia nidrosiensis Storm, 1881 – misspelling; Raja nidrosiensis Storm, 1881 – misspelling

= Dipturus nidarosiensis =

Species of cartilaginous fish

The Norwegian skate (Dipturus nidarosiensis), or black skate, is a species of skate found at depths of 200 m (660 ft) to over 1,600 m (5,200 ft) in the East Atlantic region. The species has frequently been confused with other skates, and since the late 1980s it has been confirmed to occur more widely than previously thought, ranging from Iceland to Morocco, as well as off South Africa and in the Mediterranean Sea.

== Description ==
The Norwegian skate is very large, and can reach a total length of up to 2.3 m (7.5 ft). Females grow larger than males. It is all dark brown-grey above, lacking distinct patterns. Its underparts are dark brown and often covered in blackish mucus, which separates it from some other skates in its range where adults generally have pale underparts (an exception is D. oxyrinchus, which however can be distinguished by its narrower snout). D. nidarosiensis has a total length at birth of 24–28 centimetres (9.4–11.0 in). The ventral surface is darker than the dorsal surface, and the species has a relatively short tail with 1-3 interdorsal thorns. Its upper jaw has between 30-45 rows of teeth while its lower jaw has between 39-43 rows.

== Distribution and habitat ==
The maximum reported depth range of the Norwegian skate is from 125–1,420 metres (410–4,659 ft), though they most commonly occur between 200–1,000 metres (660–3,280 ft). They live over seabed substrates of mud, sand, and rock. Initially, its range was believed to be restricted to the Norwegian Sea and North Sea to the Bay of Biscay. It is occasionally encountered off the western coast of Ireland, and historically has been found near Rockall and in the Norwegian Deep, though recent surveys have not identified the species there.

== Diet ==
At least in the Mediterranean Sea the primary prey are decapod crustaceans, followed by bony fish, while cephalopods, small elasmobranchs and polychaetes occasionally are consumed. Larger Norwegian skates have been noted to feed on larger fish species.

== Reproduction ==
D. nidarosiensis is oviparous. The egg case consists in a very large capsule with a long rectangular shape and pointed horns at the corners, deposited on sandy and muddy bottoms. The egg cases are very large and measure 18–26 centimetres (7.1–10.2 in) long and 9.5–12 centimetres (3.7–4.7 in) wide.

== Conservation ==
The Norwegian skate is listed on the IUCN Red List as endangered because of increased pressures upon populations as a result of targeted fishing of sharks and rays and an estimated population reduction of over 50% across the past three generations.
