= Prownose skate =

Conservation status
- Data Deficient (IUCN 3.1)

Scientific classification
- Kingdom: Animalia
- Phylum: Chordata
- Class: Chondrichthyes
- Subclass: Elasmobranchii
- Order: Rajiformes
- Family: Rajidae
- Genus: Dipturus
- Species: D. stenorhynchus

Binomial name
- Dipturus stenorhynchus (J. H. Wallace, 1967)

Species of fish

The prownose skate (Dipturus stenorhynchus) is a species of fish in the family Rajidae. It is found off Mozambique and South Africa. Its natural habitat is open seas.
