= Rattail skate =

Conservation status
- Data Deficient (IUCN 3.1)

Scientific classification
- Kingdom: Animalia
- Phylum: Chordata
- Class: Chondrichthyes
- Subclass: Elasmobranchii
- Order: Rajiformes
- Family: Rajidae
- Genus: Dipturus
- Species: D. lanceorostratus

Binomial name
- Dipturus lanceorostratus (J. H. Wallace, 1967)

Species of fish

The rattail skate (Dipturus lanceorostratus) is a species of fish in the family Rajidae. It is endemic to Mozambique. Its natural habitat is open seas.
