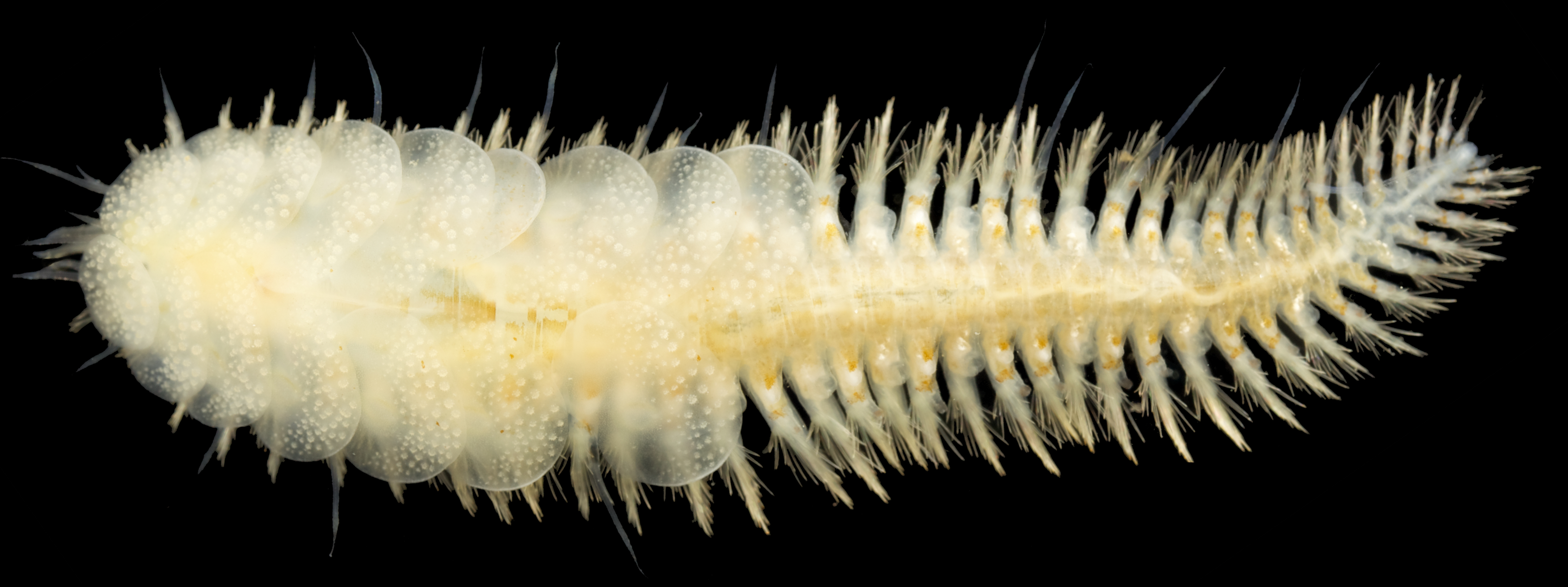
- Leucia nivea (Polynoidae)

Scientific classification
- Kingdom: Animalia
- Phylum: Annelida
- Clade: Pleistoannelida
- Subclass: Errantia
- Order: Phyllodocida
- Family: Polynoidae
- Genus: Leucia; Malmgren, 1867

Type species
- Polynoe nivea Sars, 1863

= Leucia =

Genus of annelids

Leucia is a genus of marine polychaete worms belonging to the family Polynoidae, the scaleworms. Leucia contains 2 species, both found in the northern Atlantic Ocean. This genus is distinguished from the closely related genus Harmothoe by having sixteen pairs of elytra, as opposed to fifteen.

== Description ==
Body short, 41 to 50 segments, 16 pairs of elytra. Anterior margin of prostomium with pair of acute anterior peaks. Lateral antennae inserted ventrally (beneath prostomium and median antenna). Antennae, palps, dorsal and ventral cirri papillated. First segment with chaetae. Notochaetae distinctly thicker than neurochaetae. Unidentate and bidentate neurochaetae present.

== Species ==
The World Register of Marine Species includes the following species in the genus:

- Leucia nivea (M. Sars, 1863)
- Leucia violacea (Storm, 1879)
