= Harmothoe (disambiguation) =

Harmothoe (Ancient Greek Ἁρμοθόη) is a name that may refer to:

- In Greek mythology:
  - Harmothoe (Amazon), attendant warrior of Penthesilea
  - Harmothoe, wife of Pandareus
- Harmothoe, a genus of Polychaete worms
