= Dipturus teevani =

Conservation status
- Least Concern (IUCN 3.1)

Scientific classification
- Kingdom: Animalia
- Phylum: Chordata
- Class: Chondrichthyes
- Subclass: Elasmobranchii
- Order: Rajiformes
- Family: Rajidae
- Genus: Dipturus
- Species: D. teevani

Binomial name
- Dipturus teevani (Bigelow and Schroeder, 1951)

Synonyms
- Raja teevani (Bigelow & Schoeder, 1951); Raja floridana (Bigelow & Schoeder, 1962)

Species of cartilaginous fish

Dipturus teevani, commonly known as the prickly brown ray or Caribbean skate, is a species of cartilaginous fish in the family Rajidae. The prickly brown ray is medium in size compared to other skates, and is known from a patchy, deep-water distribution in the western Atlantic Ocean.

== Etymology ==
The prickly brown ray's genus name, Dipturus, comes from the two Greek words: δι (di), meaning "two", and πτερύγια (pteryx), meaning fin. Its species name is a reference to ichthyologist John Teevan, in appreciation for the help he gave the authors Bigelow and Schroeder when he worked as editor-in-chief for the book, Fishes of the Western Atlantic.

== Taxonomy ==
The prickly brown ray was first given the name Raja teevani by its discoverers, Henry Bryant Bigelow and William Charles Schroeder, after being caught accidentally on a shrimp related expedition in the Gulf of Mexico in the winter of 1950-1951. The species was encountered again by Bigelow and Schroeder in 1962, and specimens were given the name Raja floridana. Animals under both names have since been moved to the genus Dipturus by Jacob and McEachran, but the name teevani was kept.

== Description ==
Prickly brown rays are considered medium-sized rays, with a maximum total length of 84 cm, while males reach maturity around 63 cm. They normally are light/pale brown on top and cream-colored to dusky on bottom. Both the dorsal and caudal fins are black, and the dorsal fin is fully connected at its base. The anterior margins and the trailing tips of the pectoral fins are both concave, and they are incised deeply near the tail. Visible thorns (denticles) are only found near the eyes and in a single row on the top of the tail. Like many other skates and rays, the eggs of the prickly brown ray have horn-like projections.

Dipturus teevani can be distinguished from other rays in its genus by its long snout (22% of total length), which forms an acute angle with the pectoral fins (around 70°). The length of the pectoral fin radials is roughly 40% the length of the snout. The mouth is slightly arched on either side of the symphysis and the upper jaw contains 36 to 38 rows of teeth. The oronasal pit is absent, and the anterior (the larger of the two) and posterior pelvic lobes are connected to each other by a fin-membrane. The prickly brown ray's tail can be from 48% to 53% of the total length and is just as wide at its middle as its base.

== Distribution and habitat ==
The prickly brown ray has a rather fragmented range in the western Atlantic, where it is native. Large regions: from North Carolina to the Florida Keys, from the northern Gulf of Mexico, Bahamas, Lesser Antilles, coasts of Nicaragua, Honduras and Colombia are known to support it. They have also been found in smaller-sized areas of the southern Gulf of Mexico and the coasts of Guyana, Suriname, and French Guiana and northern Brazil.

Prickly brown rays are usually bottom dwelling and live on the upper continental slope (specifically the southeast U.S. continental shelf and the north Brazil shelf) at depths from 311– 732 meters. Despite their occurrence on two shelves, as well at the open Atlantic and Caribbean Sea, little is known about their life habits or behavior because they are seldom caught.

== See also ==
- New Zealand smooth skate
- Dipturus
