= Thintail skate =

Conservation status
- Vulnerable (IUCN 3.1)

Scientific classification
- Kingdom: Animalia
- Phylum: Chordata
- Class: Chondrichthyes
- Subclass: Elasmobranchii
- Order: Rajiformes
- Family: Rajidae
- Genus: Dipturus
- Species: D. leptocauda

Binomial name
- Dipturus leptocauda (G. Krefft & Stehmann, 1975)

Synonyms
- Dipturus leptocaudus

Species of fish

The thintail skate (Dipturus leptocauda) is a species of fish in the family Rajidae. It is endemic to Brazil. Its natural habitat is open seas.
