= Norvegia transcription =

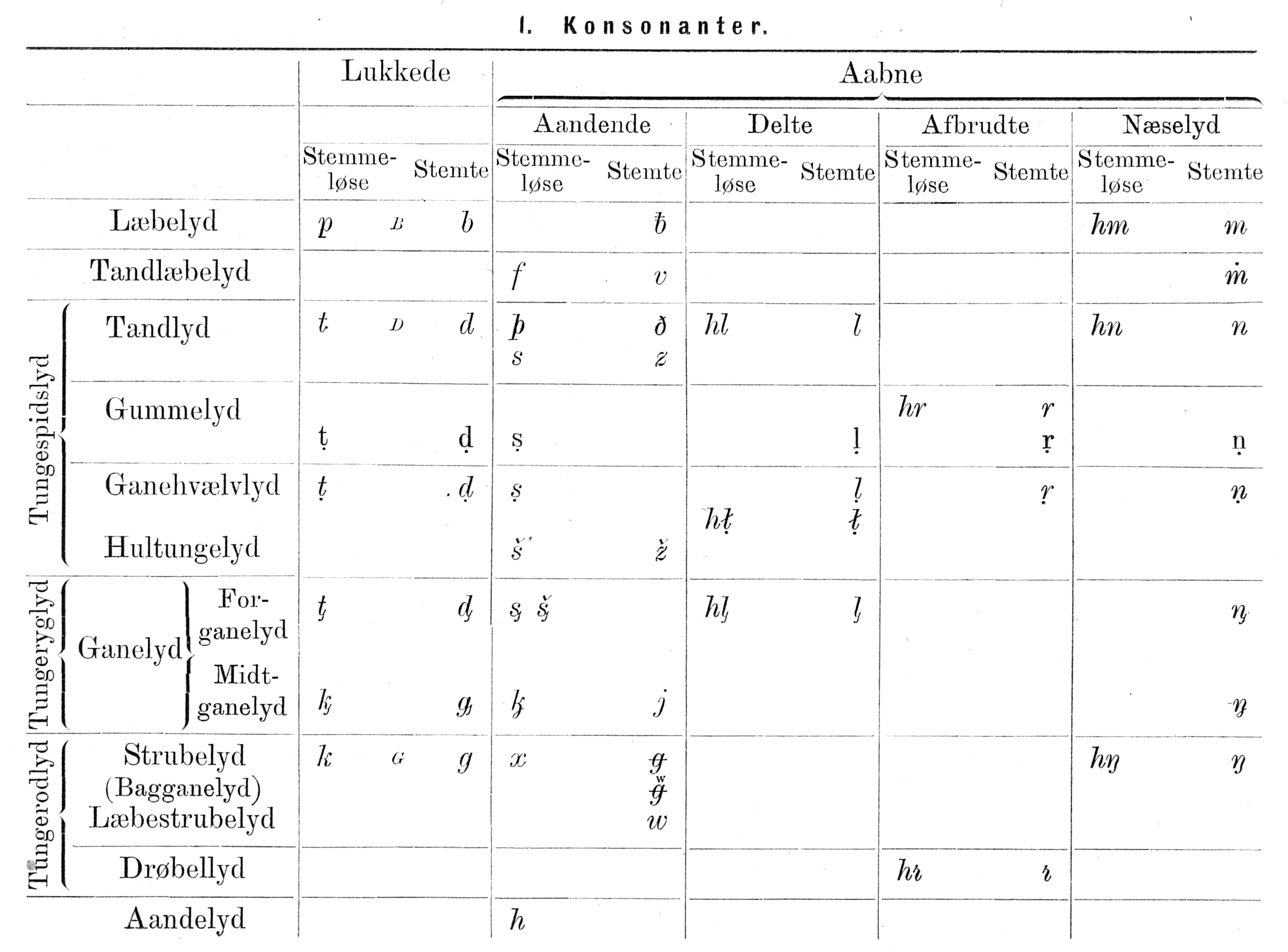
Norvegia consontants in 1884.

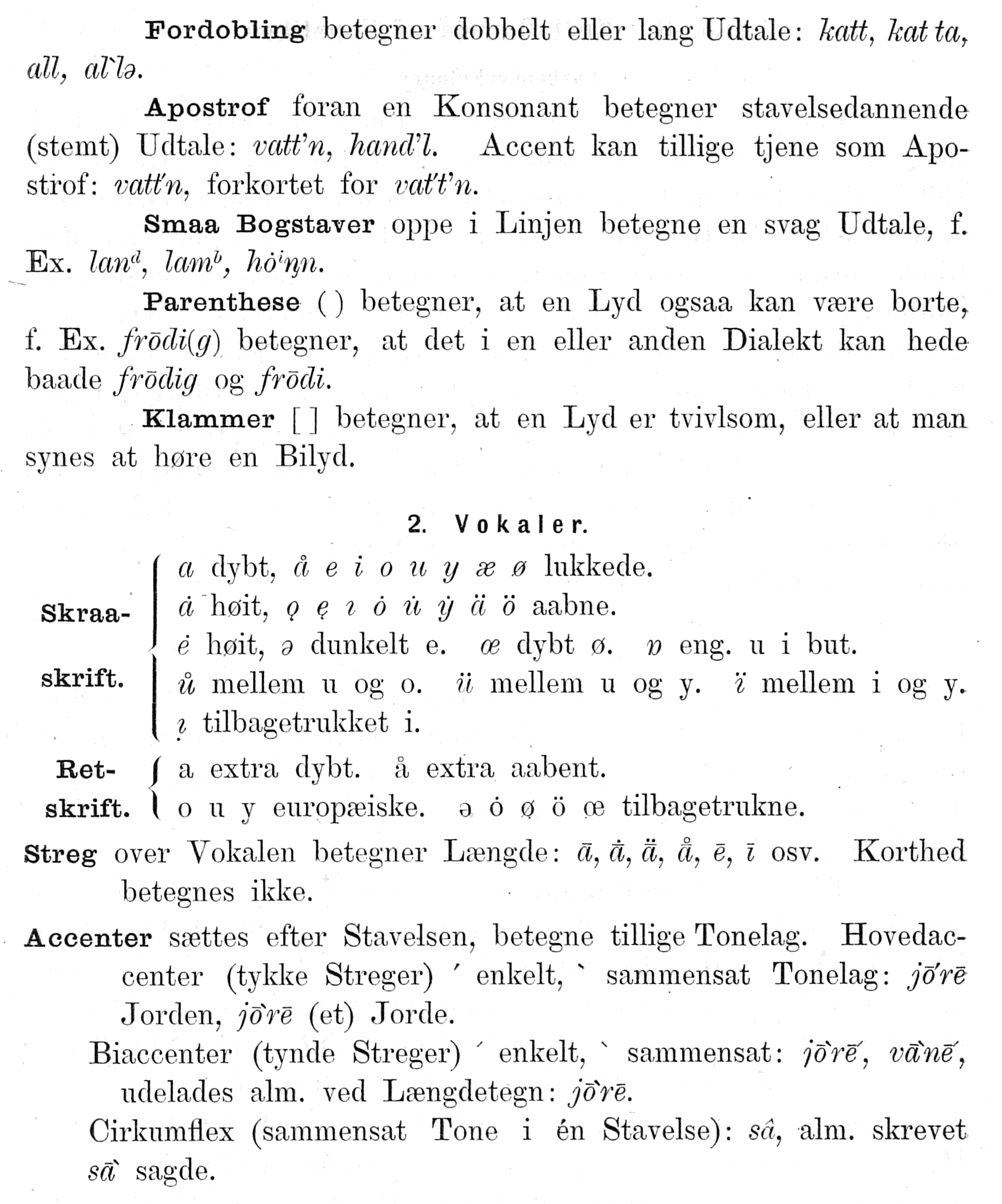
Norvegia vowels and other symbols in 1884.

Norvegia (Latin for Norway) is a phonetic transcription system which was developed by Norwegian linguist Johan Storm in 1884 and mainly used in dialectology. Norvegia is still employed in the teaching of Scandinavian studies at Norwegian universities.

== See also ==
- Dania transcription
- Kjell (letter)
