= Gustav Storm =

Norwegian historian

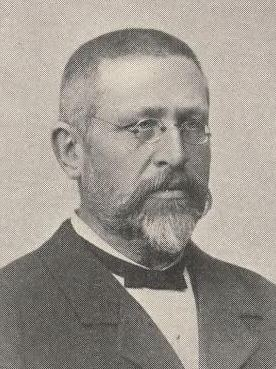
- Born: 18 June 1845; Rendalen, Norway
- Died: 23 February 1903 (aged 57); Bygdøy, Norway
- Education: Royal Frederick University
- Occupation: Historian
- Employer: Royal Frederick University
- Known for: Research of Scandinavian history and literature of the Middle Ages; Chairman of the Norwegian Historical Association; Secretary-general of the Norwegian Academy of Science and Letters
- Notable work: Translation of Heimskringla
- Relatives: Johan Storm (brother); Vilhelm Storm (cousin)
- Awards: Order of St. Olav; Order of Isabella the Catholic; Order of the Polar Star

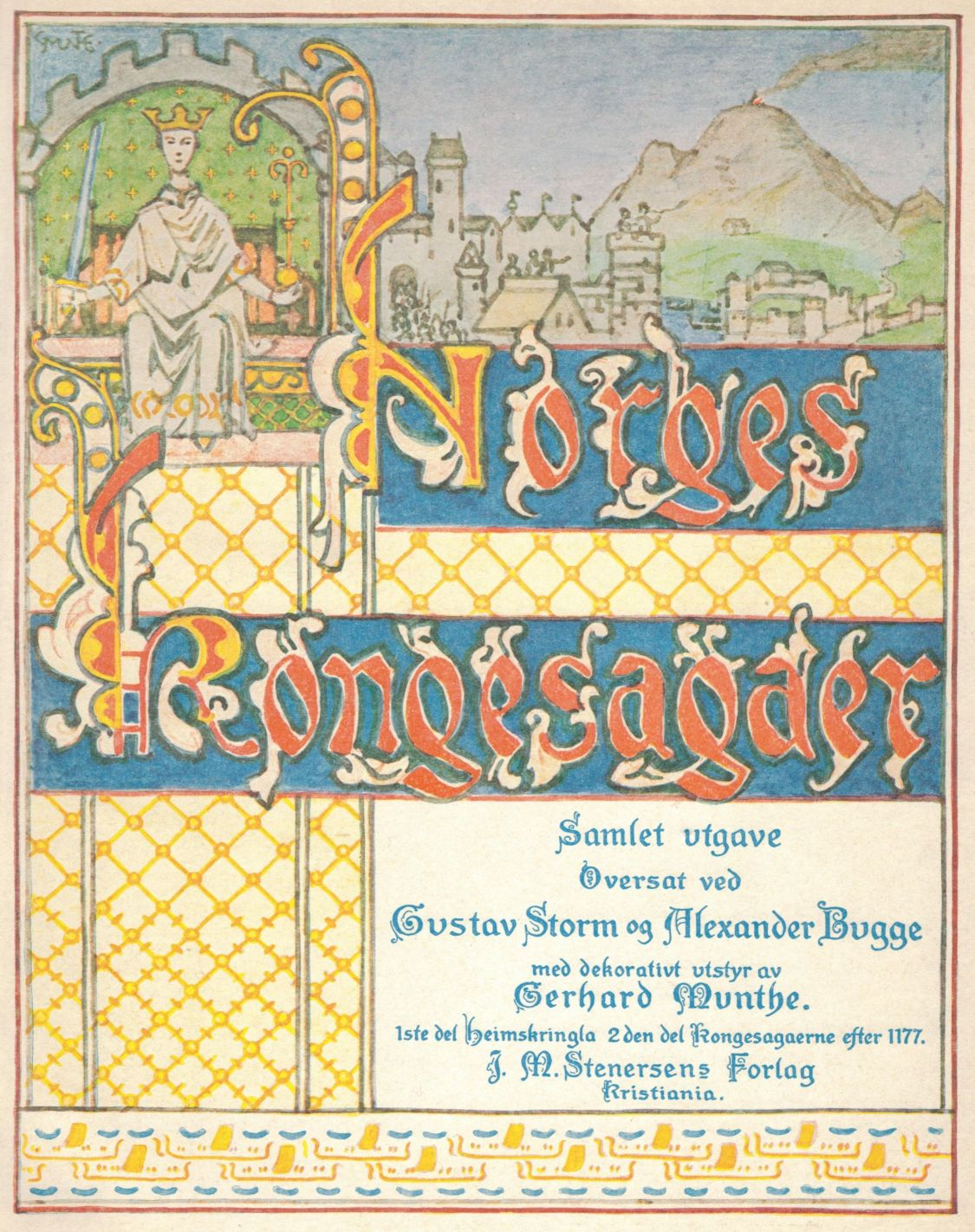
Norges kongesagaer translated by Gustav Storm and Alexander Bugge, illustrated by Gerhard Munthe

Gustav Storm (18 June 1845 – 23 February 1903) was a Norwegian historian, a professor at the Royal Frederick University in Christiania from 1877. He was a driving force in the research of Scandinavian history and literature of the Middle Ages.

== Personal life ==
Storm was born in Rendal Municipality in Hedmark county, as the son of Ole Johan Storm and Hanna Jørgine Mathilde Breda. The family moved to Lardal Municipality in Vestfold, where his father was a vicar. When Gustav was five years old, his father died, and the family subsequently moved to Christiania (now Oslo). He was a brother of linguist Johan Storm and a cousin of zoologist Vilhelm Storm. He died at Bygdøy in 1903.

== Career ==
Storm finished his secondary education in 1862. He studied philology at the Royal Frederick University in Christiania, graduating as cand.philol. in 1868. He then worked as teacher for some years, and also carried out research in the fields philology and history. Among his works were Snorre Sturlassøns Historieskrivning, en kritisk Undersøgelse from 1873, and his thesis Sagnkredsene om Karl den Store og Didrik af Bern hos de nordiske Folk from 1874. He was appointed professor of history in 1877.

Storm became a central person in history research and education at the university. He is regarded one of the most important investigators of primary sources in the science of history in Norway. He chaired the society for primary sources, Kildeskriftforeningen, from 1886 to 1903, and the Norwegian Historical Association from 1899 to 1903. He was secretary general of the learned society, the Norwegian Academy of Science and Letters from 1884 to 1903. His translation of Heimskringla into Norwegian in the late 1890s was the basis for a popular edition of Snorri Sturluson's work. Among his publications are treatments of the Battle of Hafrsfjord, studies of Norsemen's travels to Vinland, and Columbus' discovery of the American continent.

Storm was decorated Knight, First Class of the Royal Norwegian Order of St. Olav in 1891, and Commander, First Class in 1901. He was a Commander, Second Class of the Spanish Order of Isabella the Catholic, and Knight of the Swedish Order of the Polar Star.

== Selected works ==
- Om den gamle norrøne literatur (1869)
- Snorre Sturlassøns Historieskrivning, en kritisk Undersøgelse (1873)
- Sagnkretsene om Karl den Store og Didrik af Bern hos de nordiske folk (1874)
- Kritiske bidrag til vikingetidens historie (1876)
- Ragnar Lodbrok og Lodbrokssønnerne (1877)
- Vikingetidens tidligste udgangspunkter (1879)
- Studier over Vinlandsreiserne, Vinlands Geografi og Etnografi (1888)
- Maria Stuart (1891)
- Christofer Columbus og Amerikas opdagelse (1892)
- Olav den Hellige (1893)
- Norges gamle Vaaben, Farver og Flag (1894)
- Snorre Sturlasons Norges Kongesagaer (1896–99)
- Dronning Margretes valg i i Norge (1900)
