= Dipturus lamillai =

Scientific classification
- Kingdom: Animalia
- Phylum: Chordata
- Class: Chondrichthyes
- Subclass: Elasmobranchii
- Order: Rajiformes
- Family: Rajidae
- Genus: Dipturus
- Species: D. lamillai

Binomial name
- Dipturus lamillai (Concha, Caira, Ebert & Pompert, 2019)

Species of skate

Dipturus lamillai is a species of long-snout skate of the genus Dipturus. It was first described in 2019 after it was found in waters near the Falkland Islands in the southwest Atlantic Ocean. The population had previously been recorded as Zearaja chilensis, the Chilean yellow-nosed skate, but had been suspected to be a separate cryptic species, one that looks identical to another species but has distinct genetic information. It was named in honour of Julio Lamilla, a Chilean biologist.
