= Julio Lamilla =

Chilean biologist, researcher, and conservationist

Julio Francisco Lamilla Gómez (1954 – 31 March 2016) was a Chilean biologist, researcher and conservationist. Lamilla was a former student of Liceo Armando Robles Rivera in Valdivia before graduating from the Austral University of Chile in Biology and Chemistry in which he majored in Zoology.

He became a teacher and researcher at the university in 1979 and held numerous posts through his life as a conservationist and shark expert. He died of a heart attack in March 2016. Dipturus lamillai, a species of skate first described in 2019, was named in Lamilla's honour.
