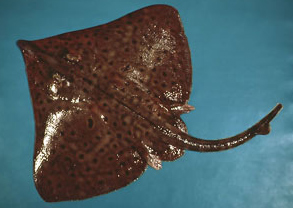
- Barndoor skate, Dipturus laevis

Conservation status
- Least Concern (IUCN 3.1)

Scientific classification
- Kingdom: Animalia
- Phylum: Chordata
- Class: Chondrichthyes
- Subclass: Elasmobranchii
- Order: Rajiformes
- Family: Rajidae
- Genus: Dipturus
- Species: D. laevis

Binomial name
- Dipturus laevis (Mitchill, 1818)

= Barndoor skate =

Species of cartilaginous fish

The barndoor skate (Dipturus laevis) is a species of marine cartilaginous fish in the skate family Rajidae of the order Rajiformes. It is native to the northwestern Atlantic Ocean, and is found from the Grand Banks of Newfoundland and the southern side of the Gulf of St. Lawrence south to North Carolina. The fish is one of the largest skates found in the North Atlantic Ocean, reaching lengths up to 1.5 m (5 ft). It is carnivorous, feeding on invertebrates and other fish found near the sea floor.

After peaking in the 1950s, the population of the barndoor skate dramatically declined in the 1960s and early 1970s as a result of overfishing. In 2003, it was listed as endangered by the World Conservation Union. However, barndoor skate populations have increased substantially since 1990 and even surpassed 1960s population size by 2012. In 2019, the barndoor skate was downlisted to least concern by the IUCN based on its largely increased population, new protections within its range, and also minor expansions to its range. In most cases, the barndoor skate is not intentionally harvested by the commercial fishing industry—it is usually considered bycatch in the trawling nets used to target other species of fish.

== Description ==
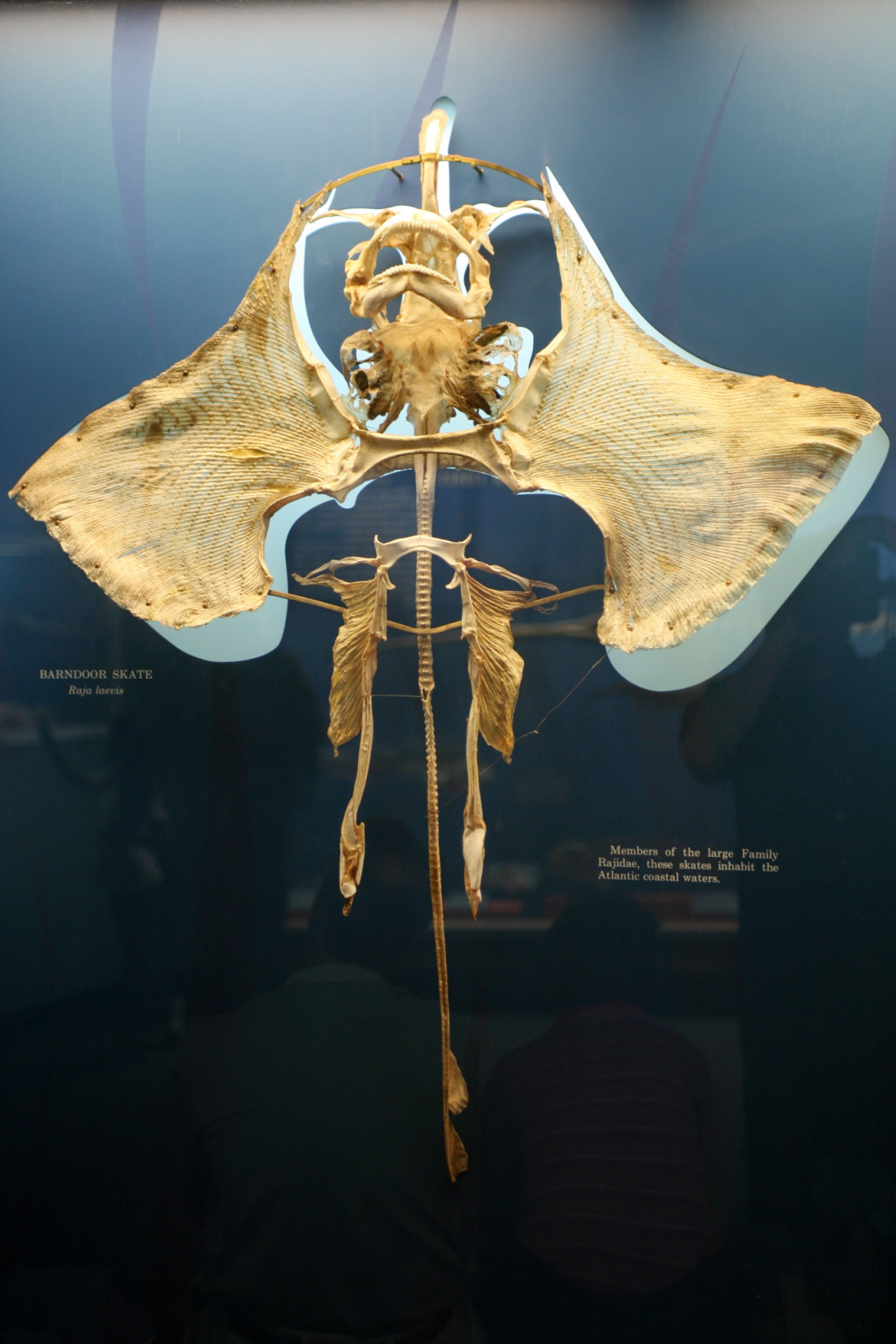
Skeleton

The barndoor skate is a flat-bodied fish with a large, disk-like body with sharply angled corners and a pointed snout. Its pectoral fins have evolved into broad, flat, wing-like appendages used to propel the fish through the water. These fins have a concave front edge with rounded posterior corners. Like sharks, it has a boneless skeleton made of cartilage, a tough, elastic substance composed of collagenous and/or elastic fibers, cells, and a firm, gel-like substance called the matrix. It has slot-like body openings called gill slits on the underside of the body beneath the pectoral fins that lead from the gills. The dorsal fins are close together and far removed from the tail. It has two eyes on its dorsal surface, located about 5.5 centimeters (2.2 in) apart.

The fish's upper surface is brown to reddish brown with many scattered darker spots, lighter streaks, and reticulations. The center of each pectoral fin is marked with an oval spot or blotch. The lower surface is light, white to grey, blotched irregularly with gray spots. The barndoor skate is unique from other species of skate in its having a straight line that begins at the snout and ends at the anterior margin of the outer corner of the disk, but stopping short of the disk.

The barndoor skate is one of the largest skates found in the North Atlantic Ocean. It can reach lengths of up to 1.5 m (5 ft) and can weigh up to 18 kg (40 lb). There have been unconfirmed reports of individuals reaching lengths of 1.8 meters (6 ft). A 71–76 cm (28–30 in) barndoor skate typically weighs 2–3 kg (4–7 lb).

The tail is moderately short and does not have large, thornlike structures called dermal denticles that are normally found on skates. This lack of denticles distinguishes it from all but two species of skates found in the western Atlantic. Larger individuals do have three rows of smaller denticles on the tail, and mature females also possess denticles on the head and shoulders, and along the dorsal midbelt of the disk and tail. Denticles are completely absent on small individuals.

== Habitat ==
The barndoor skate occurs in a range extending from the banks of Newfoundland, the southern Gulf of St. Lawrence, and along the northeastern coast and offshore banks of Nova Scotia south to North Carolina. Reports in the 19th century said the range of the fish extended as far south as northeastern Florida, but more recent research suggests that the Florida discoveries may have actually been a misidentification of R. floridana. It is found on various types of ocean bottoms, including soft muddy, sandy, and rocky bottoms. It can be found from the shoreline to depths to 750 m (2,460 ft), although it is most commonly found at depths less than 150 m (500 ft). It inhabits waters in a broad range of temperatures, from just above freezing to 20 °C (68 °F). It appears to move closer to shore in the autumn and further out to sea in the warmer months. It tolerates brackish water where the salinity is as low as 21 to 24 parts per thousand, but it prefers salinity between 31 and 35 parts per thousand. It is believed to not exhibit any north-south migratory patterns.

== Diet ==
The fish is carnivorous, with its prey consisting mainly of benthic invertebrates and fishes. Such food items include polychaetes, gastropods, bivalve mollusks, rock crabs, cancer crabs, spider crabs, lobsters, shrimps, squids, and fishes including spiny dogfish, alewife, Atlantic herring, menhaden, hakes, sculpins, cunner, tautog, sand lance, butterfish, and various flounders. Juveniles primarily subsist on benthic invertebrates such as polychaetes, copepods, amphipods, isopods, crangon shrimp, and euphausiids. Individuals have been found with the denticles on the snout worn smooth, indicating that the snout is used to dig in the mud or sand to obtain bivalve mollusks.

== Importance to humans ==
The barndoor skate is one of five skates in the Gulf of Maine that has commercial value, but of those, the species that are most frequently targeted are the winter skate (Leucoraja ocellata) and the thorny skate (Amblyraja radiata). The barndoor skate is most commonly considered bycatch by commercial trawlers operating in the northwestern Atlantic that target other commercially valuable species of fish using bottom trawling. When harvested, the flesh of the barndoor skate is used as bait, fish meal, and pet food, and the meat from its wings is sold for human consumption. Since 1981, landings of skates have increased substantially, partly in response to increased demand for lobster bait, and more significantly, to the increased export market for skate wings. The commercial retention and sale of barndoor skates was prohibited in the United States from 2003 until 2018.

== Conservation ==
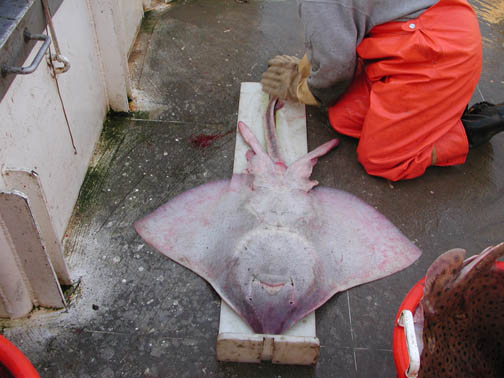
Barndoor skate caught during an NOAA research cruise

Abundances of barndoor skate dropped precipitously in the 1960s and early 1970s, coinciding with the period of intense fishing by foreign factory trawlers. The abundance remained very low through around 1990, but increased nearly exponentially from 1990 to 2005, and have been approaching the levels observed in the 1960s. In 2012, they surpassed 1960s population levels. In 1998, Casey and Myers published a controversial study claiming that the barndoor skate was nearly extinct; however, they only presented data through 1993, so the recovery that had started in the early 1990s was not yet clearly evident. In 1999, two conservation groups, GreenWorld, based in Cambridge, Massachusetts, and the Center for Marine Conservation, based in Washington, DC, petitioned the National Marine Fisheries Service (NMFS) to have the barndoor skate listed under the Endangered Species Act. After a 12-month study, the NMFS announced in 2002 that listing the species as endangered or threatened was not warranted. It cited increases in abundance and biomass of barndoor skate observed during surveys since 1993, which had become quite rapid by that time. In 1994, the World Conservation Union had listed the barndoor skate as "vulnerable" under the 1994 Categories and Criteria, but in 2003, it reassessed the species as endangered on the IUCN Red List. In 2019, the species was downgraded to least concern because of its greatly increased population size.

Each year, the National Oceanic and Atmospheric Administration (NOAA) estimates current population levels for a variety of aquatic species of special interest, and releases an annual report showing the progress being made to reduce harvesting of overfished species. When a species has been determined to be either overfished or subject to overfishing, the regional fishery management councils are required to develop a plan to correct the problem. In 2006, NOAA published a press release stating that as a result of conservation efforts, between 2004 and 2005, monitored stocks of the barndoor skate had grown to a level that the NOAA no longer considers "overfished".

== Taxonomy and naming ==
The fish was originally described as Raja laevis by Samuel Latham Mitchill in 1818. The scientific name was later changed to the currently valid name Dipturus laevis. It has also been misidentified as Raia granulata by Theodore Gill, an American ichthyologist, in 1879. The genus name, Dipturus, is derived from the Greek words di, meaning two, and pteryx, meaning wing. Raja, the original genus which was coined by Carl Linnaeus in 1758, is still recognized as a valid subgenus.

== See also ==
- Fisheries management
