= John Tee-Van =

American biologist and zookeeper

- Born: July 6, 1897; Brooklyn, New York, United States
- Died: November 5, 1967 (aged 70); Sherman, Connecticut, United States
- Education: New York University
- Occupations: Ichthyologist and zookeeper
- Employer: New York Zoological Society
- Spouse: Helen T. Damrosch
- Parent(s): Patrick J. Tee-Van and Wilhelmina Wehnke Tee-Van

John Tee-Van (July 6, 1897 – November 5, 1967) was an American ichthyologist and zoologist. He began his career as an apprentice zookeeper at the New York Zoological Park (now the Bronx Zoo) and ended it as its General Director.

== Early life ==
Born in Brooklyn, New York son of Patrick J. Tee-Van and Wilhelmina Wehnke Tee-Van, John attended school in New York City and took courses in zoology at New York University. He began his career at the Bronx Zoo in 1911, at the age of 14, as an apprentice keeper in the Bird Department, joining the zoo after the death of his father, who had also been an employee of the zoo.

== Career ==
=== Work with William Beebe ===
Tee-Van left his position in the Bird Department in 1917 after Department Curator William Beebe heard that Tee-Van took night classes in architectural drafting and asked him to draw a bird bone. Beebe was so impressed with Tee-Van's drawing that he immediately made him an assistant in his new department (which was to become the Department of Tropical Research). For the next 26 years, Tee-Van was a valuable member of Beebe's famed team, both as a scientific assistant and observer and as a practical organizer. Throughout the expeditions, he prepared and illustrated scientific papers and collaborated with Beebe on Field Book of the Shore Fishes of Bermuda and the Fishes of Port-au-Prince Bay, Haiti.

=== Trip to China ===
In 1941, two young giant pandas were offered by Madame Chiang Kai-shek, the wife of the Chairman of the Nationalist Government of China, and her sister Madame H. H. Kung, to the organization United China Relief. The organization promised the pandas to the Bronx Zoo, which sent John Tee-Van to bring them back from China. He left on September 25, 1941, on a journey to Chengdu, in southwest China. He was at sea in the Pacific on his return trip with the pandas during the attack on Pearl Harbor in December of that year but arrived safely in San Francisco a few days after. The pandas made it to the zoo in good health, though there was trouble with procuring bamboo for them along the way. Tee-Van documented his entire journey to China in journals and photographs, and he saved many mementos such as invitations, newspaper clippings, personal letters, and boarding passes.

=== Work in New York Zoological Society Administration ===
Having returned to the zoo in 1940 as executive secretary and administrative assistant to the president of the New York Zoological Society (now the Wildlife Conservation Society), Tee-Van became director of the Bronx Zoo in 1952, a position he held until 1962. In 1956 he became the general director of both the zoo and the New York Aquarium.

During his administration at the Bronx Zoo, Tee-Van was responsible for gaining Social Security, Hospitalization and Group Life Insurance for the NYZS employees and founded the staff publication Zoo-Log.

In 1961 NYZS presented Tee-Van with its gold medal in recognition of his scientific achievements and service to the Society. In his acceptance speech, Tee-Van said "I want to give my blessings to the millions of animals I have known".

After 50 years, 10 months and 13 days service, John Tee-Van retired from NYZS on July 5, 1962, at the age of 65. Apart from William Beebe, Tee-Van was the only member of staff to ever achieve 50 years of active service at that time. He continued on at the zoo after his retirement, returning to the Department of Tropical Research to continue his work on fishes.

== Expeditions ==
- 1917: British Guiana
- 1919–1920: British Guiana
- 1921–1922: British Guiana, Trinidad and Venezuela
- 1923: Panama and the Galapagos Islands
- 1924: British Guiana
- 1925: Sargasso Sea, Caribbean to the Galapagos Islands (Arcturus Expedition)
- 1926: Europe
- 1927: Haiti
- 1929–1935: Bermuda Oceanographic Expedition (including Bathysphere descents in 1930, 1932 and 1934)
- 1936: West Indies
- 1936: Gulf of Lower California (Zaca Expedition)
- 1937: Bermuda Oceanographic Expedition
- 1937–1938: Gulf of Lower California, coast of Mexico, Central America and Colombia (Zaca Expedition)
- 1938–1939: Bermuda Oceanographic Expedition
- 1941: Australia and China (brought back 2 giant pandas for the Bronx Zoo from Madame Chiang Kai-shek)
- 1946: Venezuela
- 1952: Bermuda
- 1953 and 1955: European zoos and aquariums
- 1956: British Guiana and Trinidad
- 1960: Trinidad
- 1961: European zoos and aquariums

== Other endeavors and achievements ==
- Became Editor-in-chief of Fishes of the North Atlantic in 1940
- Honorary degree of Doctor of Science from Rensselaer Polytechnic Institute (1955)

== Clubs and organizations ==
- New York Zoological Society – Fellow in 1934 and Life Member from 1954
- New York Academy of Sciences – Fellow in 1936 and Councillor from 1949, Recording Secretary 1952–1953, Vice President and President in 1954
- International Union Directors of Zoological Gardens – Member from 1953
- Museums Council of New York City – Chairman 1945-1948
- Century Association – Resident member from 1947
- The Explorers Club – Active resident member 1925–1953, Member of the Board of Directors 1947–1952, 1954–1956, Third Vice President in 1948, First Vice-president 1949–1950, 18th President 1951–1952, Honorary life member from 1953.
- Boone & Crockett Club – Associate Member from 1943 and Vice-president 1955-1957
- American Society of Ichthyologists and Herpetologists – Member from 1933, on the Board of Governors 1942-1947 and 1954–1958, Vice President 1951–1954.
- Trinidad Field Naturalists Club – Honorary Member from 1921
- Pacific Sailfish Club (Panama) – Honorary Member from 1938
- American Association of Museums – Member from 1953
- Brookgreen Gardens (South Carolina) – Member of the advisory board from 1949
- New-York Historical Society – Member from 1951
- American Institute of Park Executives – Fellow from 1947
- American Association for the Advancement of Science

== Scientific Namesakes ==
Tee-Van had the following species named after him;

- Armitermes teevani Emerson (Termite), Zoologica, VI: 371
- Hermtia teevani Curran (Fly), Bull. Amer. Mus. Nat. Hist., LXVI: 316
- Richardia teevani Curran (Fly), Bull. Amer. Mus. Nat. Hist., LXVI: 422
- Galapagurus teevani Boone (Crustacean), Zoologica, XIV: 12
- Periploma teevani Hertlein & Strong (Mollusk), Zoologica, 36: 95
- Anachis teevani Hertlein & Strong (Mollusk), Zoologica, 36: 83
- Cetomimus teevani Harry (Fish), Zoologica, 37: 61
- Raja teevani (Bigelow and Schroeder, 1951) (Fish), Journ. Wash. Acad., 41 (12) 1951: 388

== Personal life ==
Tee-Van married Helen Damrosch on July 17, 1923; they had no children. Helen was an accomplished animal illustrator and author who was also a member of the Department of Tropical Research staff.

== Death ==
Tee-Van had a stroke in early 1966 which left him partially paralyzed, and he died at his home in Sherman, Connecticut on November 5, 1967.

== See also ==
- Category:Taxa named by John Tee-Van
