= Dipturus trachyderma =

Conservation status
- Endangered (IUCN 3.1)

Scientific classification
- Kingdom: Animalia
- Phylum: Chordata
- Class: Chondrichthyes
- Subclass: Elasmobranchii
- Order: Rajiformes
- Family: Rajidae
- Genus: Dipturus
- Species: D. trachyderma

Binomial name
- Dipturus trachyderma Krefft & Stehmann, 1975

Synonyms
- Dipturus trachydermus

Species of cartilaginous fish

Dipturus trachyderma, the roughskin skate, is a skate belonging in the family of Rajidae and the genus Dipturus. They live between the Southeast Pacific and Southwest Atlantic Ocean. They are one of the largest marine skates reaching up to about 265 cm (104 in) in length. They are also known for their slow growth, long life span that ranges to around 25 years and late sexual maturity at around 15 to 17 years old. Due to their slow growth and late sexual maturity, D. trachyderma is vulnerable to exploitation.

== Description ==
The roughskin skate is able to grow up to a length of 265 cm (104 in). Males are usually smaller than females. Females reach an average of 215 cm (85 in) and males reach an average of 195 cm (77 in). The average disc width of tagged females from Chile was 73.5 cm (28.9 in). They have a broad, flattened body with a rough dorsal surface, large pectoral fins that extend from their body like wings, a long tail with a singular row of small spines and coloration patterns that helps with camouflage against the seabed. The species uses two modes of locomotion: oscillatory and undulatory movement. When using oscillatory movement, this skate uses its pectoral fins like wings, and when using undulatory movement, their fins have a wave-like motion. Oscillation is common while cruising and undulatory movement is often used while hovering near seabeds. Roughskin skates were considered to be closely related to yellownose skates (Dipturus chilensis), which suggested that there could have been a history of hybridization or these two skates may be members of a cryptic species complex.

== Habitat and distribution ==
The roughskin skate occupies a cold-temperate marine environment. They are distributed in many places such as the Southeast Pacific and Southwest Atlantic from Coquimbo, Chile, southward around Cape Horn and northward to Rio de la Plata, Uruguay and the Falkland Islands. They are demersal and are usually found with a depth of 85–480 metres (280–1,570 ft). In Chilean waters, they can be found at a depth of 200–350 metres (660–1,150 ft) and in Argentinian waters, they can be found between 80–150 metres (260–490 ft) in depth. They can go as deep as 500 metres (1,640 ft) on the continental shelf. This species prefers soft-bottom substrates such as muddy or sandy sediments, which can provide cover and foraging opportunities.

== Life cycle ==
The roughskin skate has a slow growth rate and long lifespan. Usually females become sexually mature at 17.5 years with an average length of 215 cm (85 in). Males usually become sexually mature at 15.3 old with an average length of 195 cm (77 in). The oldest male was found to be around 25 years old and the oldest female was determined to be 26. The females are oviparous with an ovarian fecundity ranging from 28-68 follicles per female. The females have a continuous reproductive cycle with multiple breeding peaks annually. Due to the slow growth rate, roughskin skates are vulnerable to population decline when faced with overfishing.

== Fishery and exploitation ==
Since 1970s the roughskin skate has been commercially fished in Chile and Argentina. They are one of the two species of elasmobranch that have been targeted by commercial fishing operation in Chile, the other being yellownose skate. They are usually caught by longline angling and trawl nets. They are also captured as bycatch in commercial fisheries that target Merluccius australis and Genypterus blacodes. In 1993, they became highly targeted due to Korean demand for fermented skate dish hongeo-hoe. By 2016, the Chilean government closed the skate fishery due to overexploitation. Despite this, the species is still captured by bycatch and illegal fishing. In the last three generation (64.5 years), the population has declined by 50-79%.

== Conservation status ==
There are currently no official conservation measures in place for this species. The IUCN Red List assessment suggested that this species is in risk of extinction due to severe overfishing.

Primary threats to this species includes: overfishing for commercial trade for export to Korea, bycatch mortality as the species is caught in trawl and longline angling that targets other species, slow growth and late sexual maturity which makes the species susceptible to population decline and lack of conservation measures.
