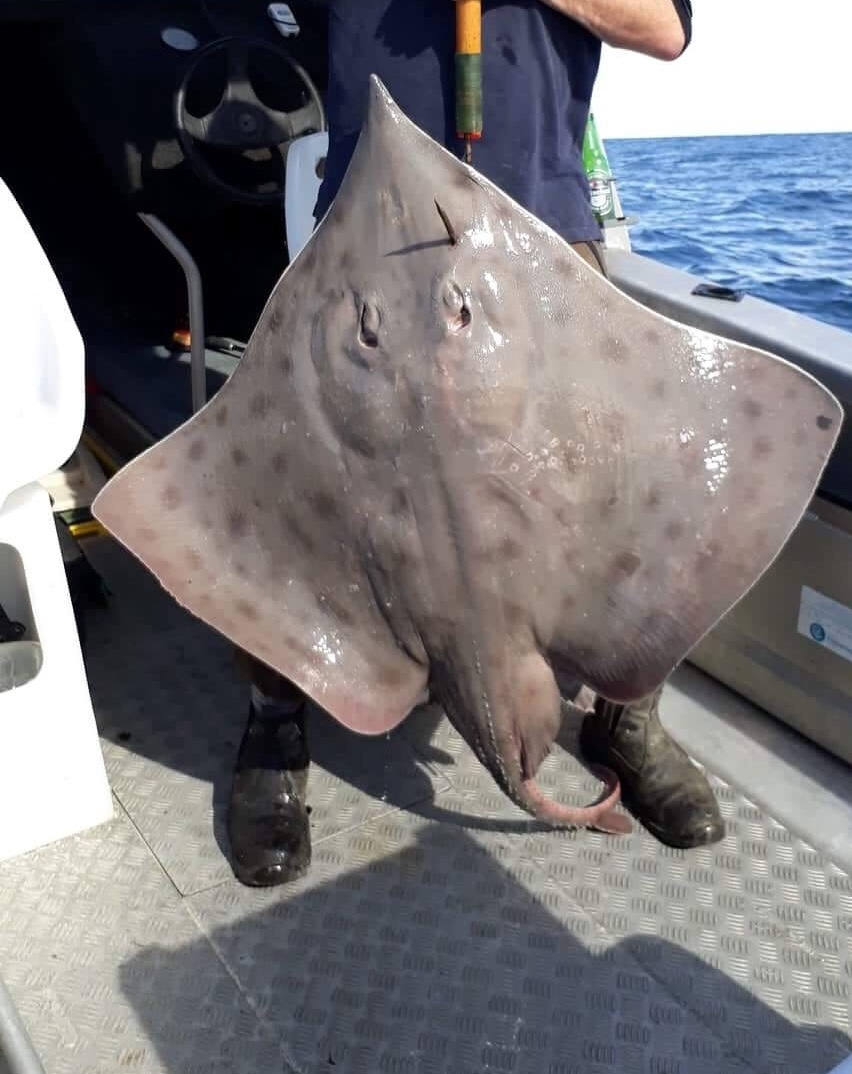
- Dipturus innominatus caught off the southern coast of the North Island

Conservation status
- Least Concern (IUCN 3.1)

Scientific classification
- Kingdom: Animalia
- Phylum: Chordata
- Class: Chondrichthyes
- Subclass: Elasmobranchii
- Order: Rajiformes
- Family: Rajidae
- Genus: Dipturus
- Species: D. innominatus

Binomial name
- Dipturus innominatus (Garrick & Paul, 1974)

= New Zealand smooth skate =

Species of cartilaginous fish

The New Zealand smooth skate (Dipturus innominatus) is a skate of the genus Dipturus, found around New Zealand at depths between 15 and 1,300 m.

== Description ==
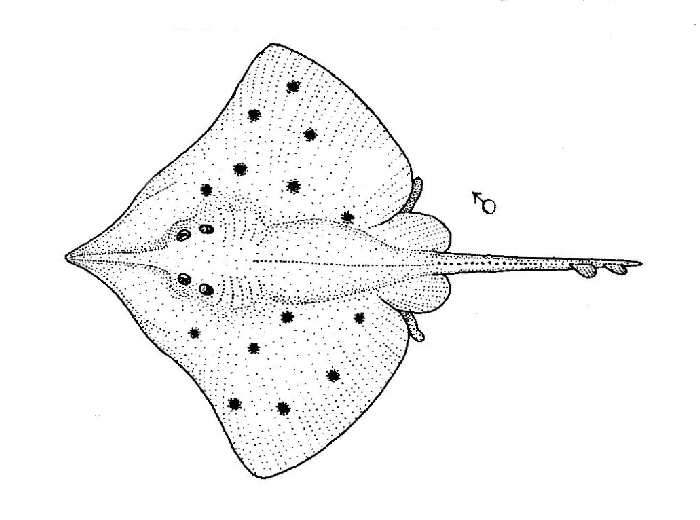
Drawing by Dr Tony Ayling

D. innominatus males grow up to 93 cm in pelvic length (PL). PL is a measure from the tip of the animals' snout to the outer margin of the pelvic fins. Contrasting the males, the female smooth skates grow to a larger size around 112 cm PL. The largest recorded female smooth skate measured 158 cm PL.

Smooth skates are the largest known skates in the world and can weigh up to 70 kg at maturity. Their length has been reported up to 2.4 m. The smooth skate has a dark grey upper side with darker grey to black spots and an underside that is lighter grey to white in colour. Some adults have small prickles or whiskers on their snouts or noses. Smooth skates are commonly mistaken for rough skates, but are larger in size and lighter in colour.

== Range and habitat ==
D. innominatus is endemic to New Zealand. They are found in the coastal waters of New Zealand's North, South and Stewart Islands, and are also found in the Snares Islands shelf and Chatham Rise. D. innominatus is found at shorelines to depths of roughly 1200 m below sea level, although it is rare to find them exceeding depths of 800 m. This species inhabits soft seafloor areas on the continental shelf and its upper slope: they are most numerous on the mid-outer continental shelf.

== Diet and foraging ==
D innominatus lives in the dermal zone near the sea bed. The feeding habits of smooth skates have been researched specifically and results have shown the effects of the commercial fishing industry on this species' feeding habits. Smooth skates are bottom-feeding predators (benthic) and scavenge for food eating dead fish and scraps from larger predators No difference exists between the diet of the individuals regarding the depth of the water or the sex of the individual.

Though no change in the diet is seen between sex and depth, a change in diet occurs with maturity of the fish. When the fish are young, most of their diet is made up of small crustaceans, and as the individuals mature, they start to consume larger crustaceans and small fish. When reaching maturity, they consume larger fish and the leftover fish from predators and commercial fishing. Mature skates no longer eat crustaceans that once were the majority their diet when they were younger. This change of diet is also seen in the skate species Sympterygia acuta, which follows a very similar diet pattern to New Zealand smooth skate.

The diet of mature D. innominatus is largely made up of shrimp, prawns, and fish coming from 17 different families. The most common of these species were found to be hoki, a deepwater cod species, and many different species of discarded fish from the commercial fishing industry.

== Predation ==
Little information is known on the predation, parasites, and diseases affecting D. innominatus. Marine mammals, especially seals, are known to feed on other species of skate, so the assumption that New Zealand marine mammals would do the same is not unrealistic. Skates are part of seals' diets, though this may be underestimated in the data, as skates do not have bony parts that are easily identified when seal stomachs are surveyed.

Predation on skate egg cases by gastropods has been recorded to affect some skate species.

Fishing has an impact on New Zealand smooth skate populations, so humans act as predators. New Zealand smooth skate is often caught as bycatch in the commercial fishing industry targeting hoki.

== Conservation status ==
In June 2018 the New Zealand Department of Conservation classified the New Zealand smooth skate as "Not Threatened" with the qualifier "Conservation Dependent" under the New Zealand Threat Classification System.
