= Anachis teevani =

Scientific classification
- Kingdom: Animalia
- Phylum: Mollusca
- Class: Gastropoda
- Subclass: Caenogastropoda
- Order: Neogastropoda
- Family: Columbellidae
- Genus: Anachis
- Species: A. teevani

Binomial name
- Anachis teevani Hertlein & A. M. Strong, 1951

Species of gastropod

Anachis teevani is a species of sea snail in the family Columbellidae, the dove snails.

== Description ==
The length of the shell attains 8 mm, its diameter is 3.5 mm.

== Distribution ==
This marine species occurs in the Pacific Ocean off Mexico.
