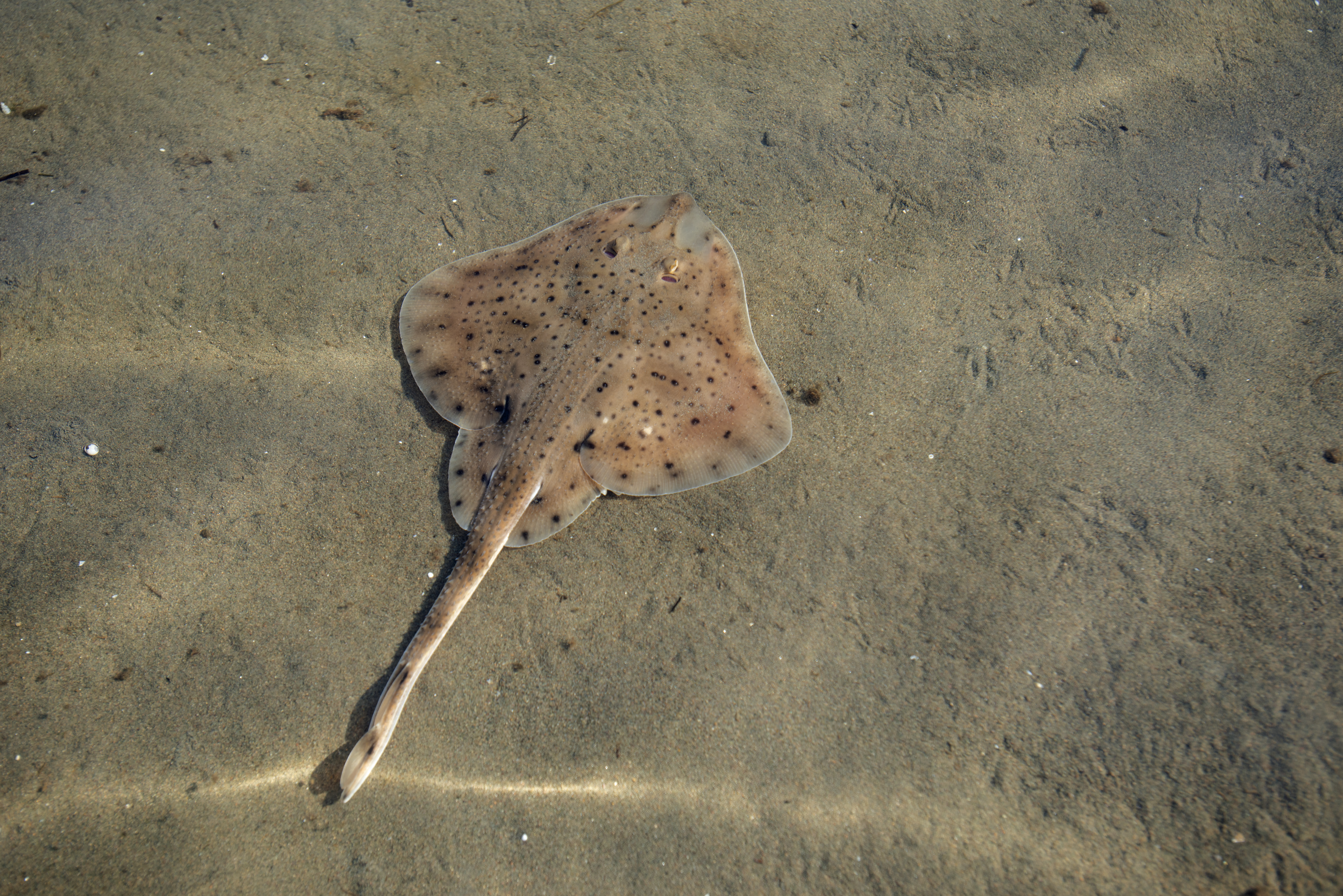

Conservation status
- Endangered (IUCN 3.1)

Scientific classification
- Kingdom: Animalia
- Phylum: Chordata
- Class: Chondrichthyes
- Subclass: Elasmobranchii
- Order: Rajiformes
- Family: Rajidae
- Genus: Leucoraja
- Species: L. ocellata

Binomial name
- Leucoraja ocellata Mitchill, 1815

= Winter skate =

Species of skate

The winter skate (Leucoraja ocellata) is an endangered species of skate found in the surrounding waters of northeastern North America. They inhabit shallow shelf waters and are prone to becoming a bycatch during commercial fishing. They are divided into three populations, the Gulf of St. Lawrence population; the Eastern Scotian Shelf and Newfoundland population; and the Western Scotian Shelf population.

== Description ==
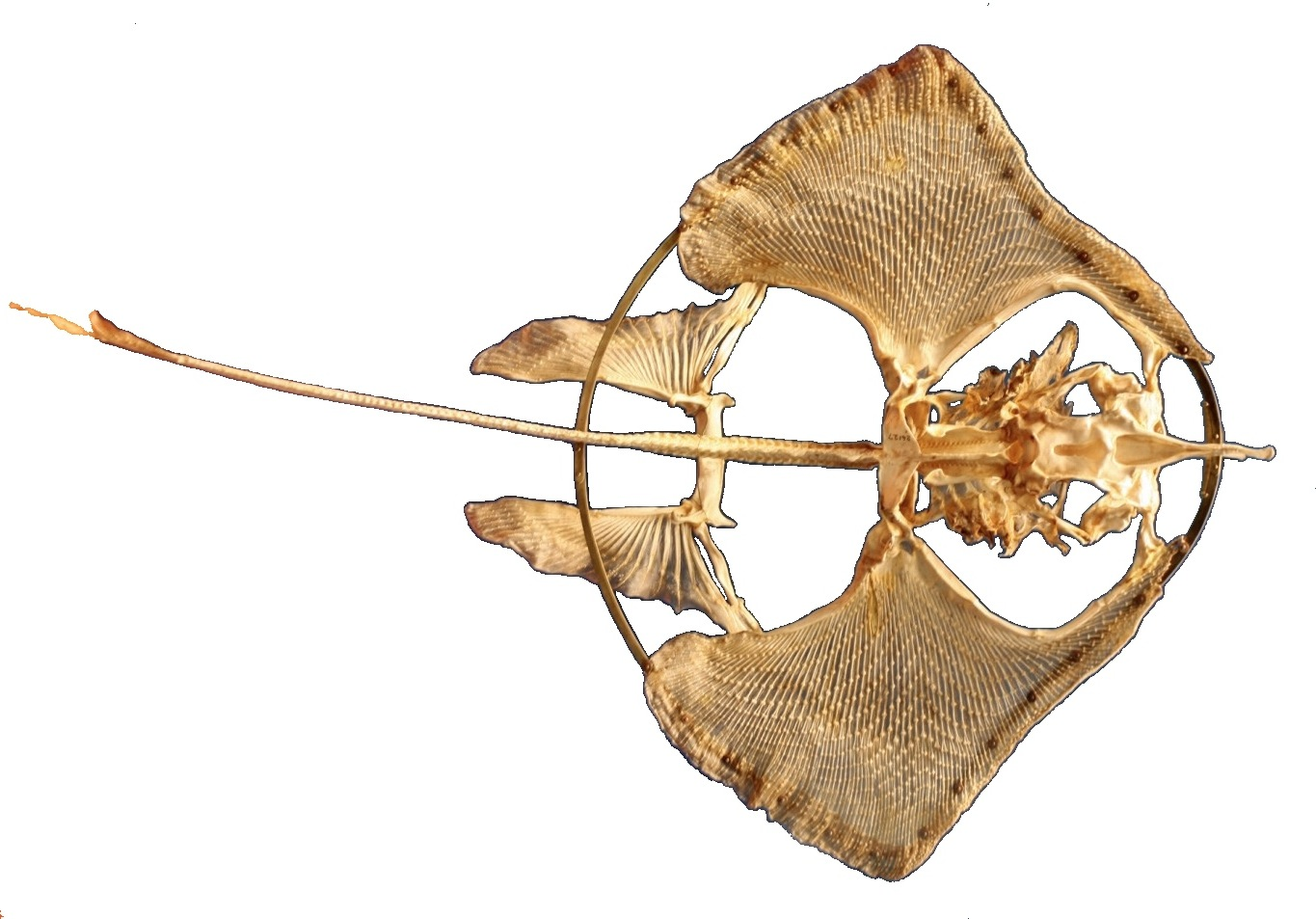
Skeleton of a winter skate

Winter skates can grow up to 109 cm (43 inches), although age at maturity varies considerably among populations, from about 5 years in the southern Gulf of St. Lawrence to 11–13 years in the Gulf of Maine.

Winter skates are light brown and have small dark spots along the dorsal side of their body. They also have small spines covering most of their disk and tails. L. ocellata usually have one to four ocelli, eye-like markings, on the upper surface of the disk, which each have a dark brown center and are pale around the edge. The lower surface is usually white with irregular light brown blotches. The upper jaw has 72 rows of teeth. L. ocellata resembles the little skate (L. erinacea). The skate's fins are used for swimming, while its tail remains stiff during most movements.

In males, 50% maturity occurs at a total length of 730 mm at 11 years old. For females, 50% maturity occurs at about 760 mm total length and approximately 11–13 years of age, depending on the study. It is a relatively late-maturing, long-lived species, making it vulnerable to exploitation. Winter skates in the southern Gulf of St. Lawrence mature at a much younger age and smaller size, with 50% maturity occurring at about five years.

== Distribution and habitat ==
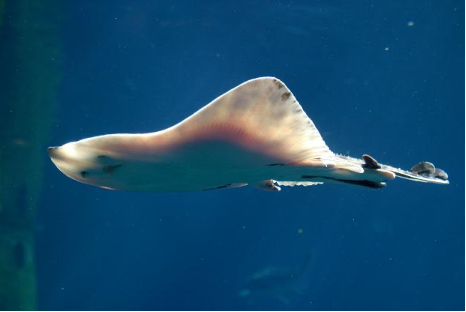
Side view of a Winter skate (L. ocellata)

This skate can be found in the northwest Atlantic Ocean, ranging from North of the Gulf of St. Lawrence in Canada to Cape Hatteras, North Carolina. Winter skates prefer sand and gravel habitats. They are primarily found in depths of 110 to 370 metres (360 to 1,210 ft) and in temperatures ranging between −1.2 and −15 °C (30 and 5 °F).

The local populations of the winter skate are not evenly distributed. L. ocellata is facing extirpation in the Southern Gulf of St. Lawrence, for example, resulting in far fewer egg cases found on local beaches. Their range has declined 99% from the 1980s to 2015 in that sector.

== Reproduction and development ==
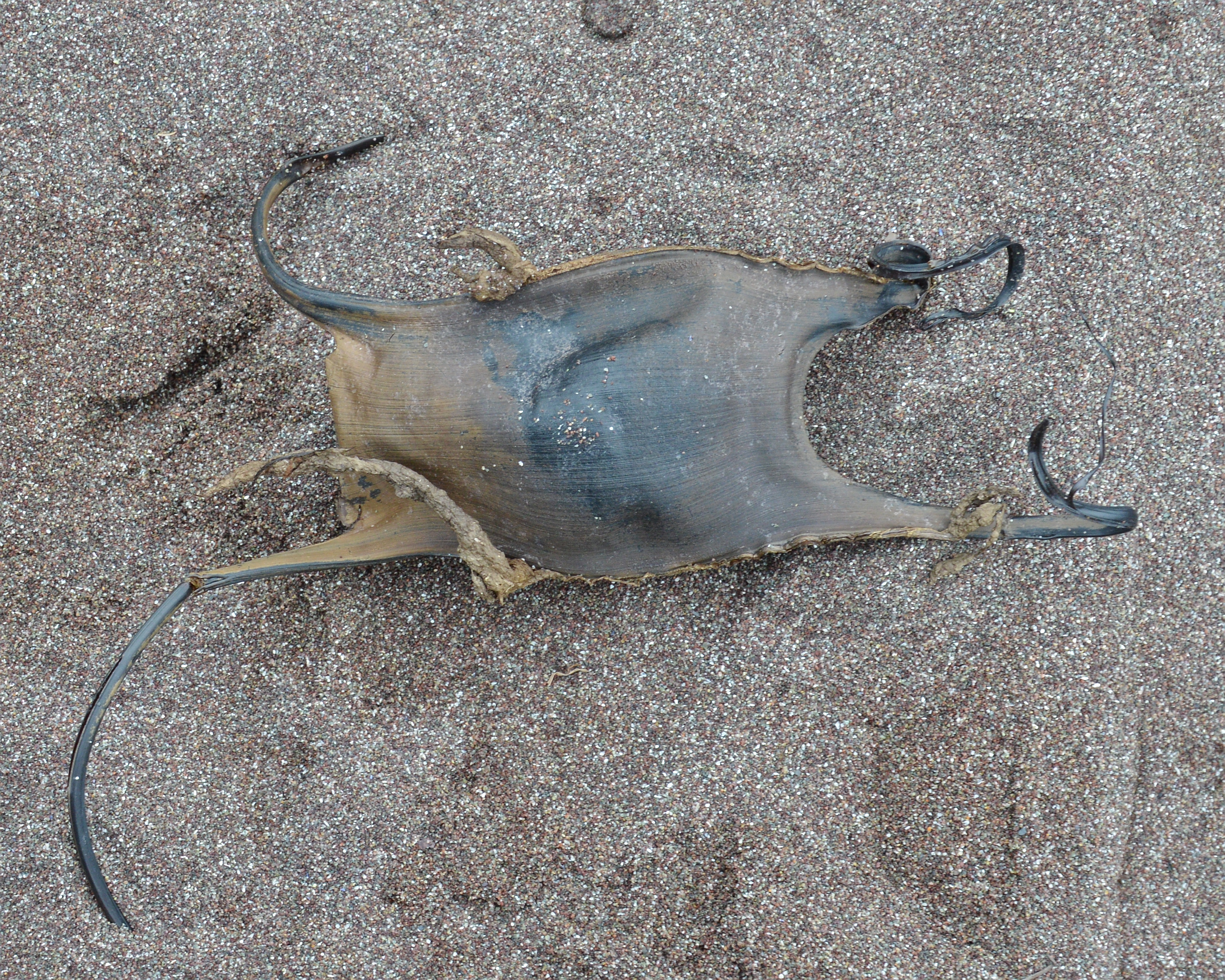
A dried-up egg case of the winter skate

Winter skates are oviparous. Their reproductive strategy involves slow growth and late maturity. They lay one egg in a purse (sometimes known as a mermaid purse) or capsule. On average, L. ocellata lays 50 eggs a year, while little skate lays 30 eggs. Gestation time for winter skate in the Gulf of Saint Lawrence is, like for the related little skate, 6 to 9 months.

== Conservation status ==
L. ocellata is considered endangered by the IUCN, due to human and natural causes, including fishing and predation.

Fishing

While there has been no directed fishing for skates in the Gulf of Saint Lawrence, L. ocellata are incidentally captured in commercial fisheries aiming to catch other fishes. Most individuals are discarded. L. ocellata are often caught in the scallop industry, since their distributions overlap.^{,} From 1971 to 1972, the estimated discard was around 100 tons, decreasing to around 70 tons in the mid-1970s, 25 tons in the 1990s, and around 1 to 2 tons since 2005. Most incidental captures are discarded. Data regarding winter skate discards has only been available since 1991, so assumptions are needed to assess previous years.

Bottom-contacting mobile fishing gear can significantly alter their habitat, including the seafloor structure and relative abundance of benthic species L. ocellata prey upon.

Natural Factors Limiting Survival

The Gulf of Saint Lawrence population decline is mostly determined by the elevated adult natural mortality. Grey seals are the largest contributor to adult mortality because of the steep rise in their population. Due to changing temperatures, their ranges overlap, particularly during summer months.

== Food and feeding habits ==
Winter skate consume a variety of prey throughout their lifetimes. As small juveniles, they consume mostly small shrimp, such as the seven-spine bay shrimp (Crangon septemspinosa) and gammarid amphipods, which are shrimp-like crustaceans. L. ocellata also consume a lot of sand lance (Ammodytes) when they are small.

Adult L. ocellata consume mostly fish, including rainbow smelt (Osmerus mordax) and winter flounder (Pseudopleuronectes americanus). They also consume Atlantic rock crab (Cancer irroratus), Atlantic razor clams (Siliquia costata), Atlantic herring (Clupea harengus), three-spined stickleback (Gasterosteus aculeatus), and various flatfish (Pleuronectiformes).
