= Johan Storm =

Norwegian professor, linguist and philologist

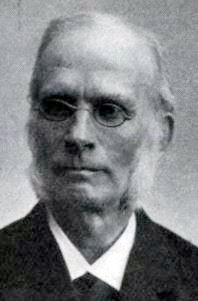
Johan Fredrik Breda Storm

Johan Fredrik Breda Storm (24 November 1836 – 26 October 1920) was a Norwegian professor, linguist and philologist. He is known for his development of the Norvegia transcription.

== Biography ==
Johan Storm was born at Lom in Gudbrandsdalen. His father, Ole Johan Storm (1806-1850) was the chaplain in Lom at the time of his birth. In 1838, the family moved to Rendal Municipality in Hedemarken county where his father was the parish priest and subsequently to Lardal Municipality in Vestfold. After the death of his father, his family moved to Christiania (now Oslo). He was from a family of six, including his brother, historian and professor Gustav Storm.

Johan Storm was a professor of English language and Romance language philology at the University of Christiania for almost four decades, from 1873 to 1912. Storm was a pioneer of modern phonetics and dialect research and made important contributions to the modernization of the teaching of living languages. He undertook the collection of Norwegian dialects, which formed the basis for his research into Norwegian phonetic writing. His work Norsk Retskrivning in two volumes (1904 and 1906) was a factor in the Norwegian language conflict.

In 1884, he introduced the Norvegia transcription used for phonetic transcription of Norwegian.

Storm was a member of the Norwegian Academy of Science and Letters from 1872. He received an honorary doctorate from the University of Edinburgh and was decorated Commander of the Royal Norwegian Order of St. Olav in 1904.

== Selected works ==
- De romanske Sprog og Folk. Skildringer fra en Studiereise med offentligt Stipendium (1871)
- Remarques sur les voyelles atones du latin, des dialectes italiques et de l'italien (1873)
- Det norske Maalstræv, særtrykk av Letterstedtske Nordisk Tidskrift (1878)
- Engelsk Filologi (1879)
- Englische philologie (1881)
- Norvegia. Tidsskrift for det norske Folks Maal og Minder (1884)
- Norsk Sprog. Kraakemaal og Landsmaal (1896)
- Franske Taleøvelser. Høiere Trin (1897)
- Ibsen og det norske Sprog. Mindeutgavens Tekst. Retskrivning og Sprogform (1907)
- Norsk Lydskrift med Omrids af Fonetiken (1908)
- Norvegia; tidsskrift for det norske folks maal og minder (1908)

== Other sources ==
- Linn, Andrew R. (2005) Johan Storm: dhi grétest pràktikal liNgwist in dhi werld (Oxford, Blackwell Publishers) ISBN 9781405121521
