= Richard Parnell =

British physician and naturalist

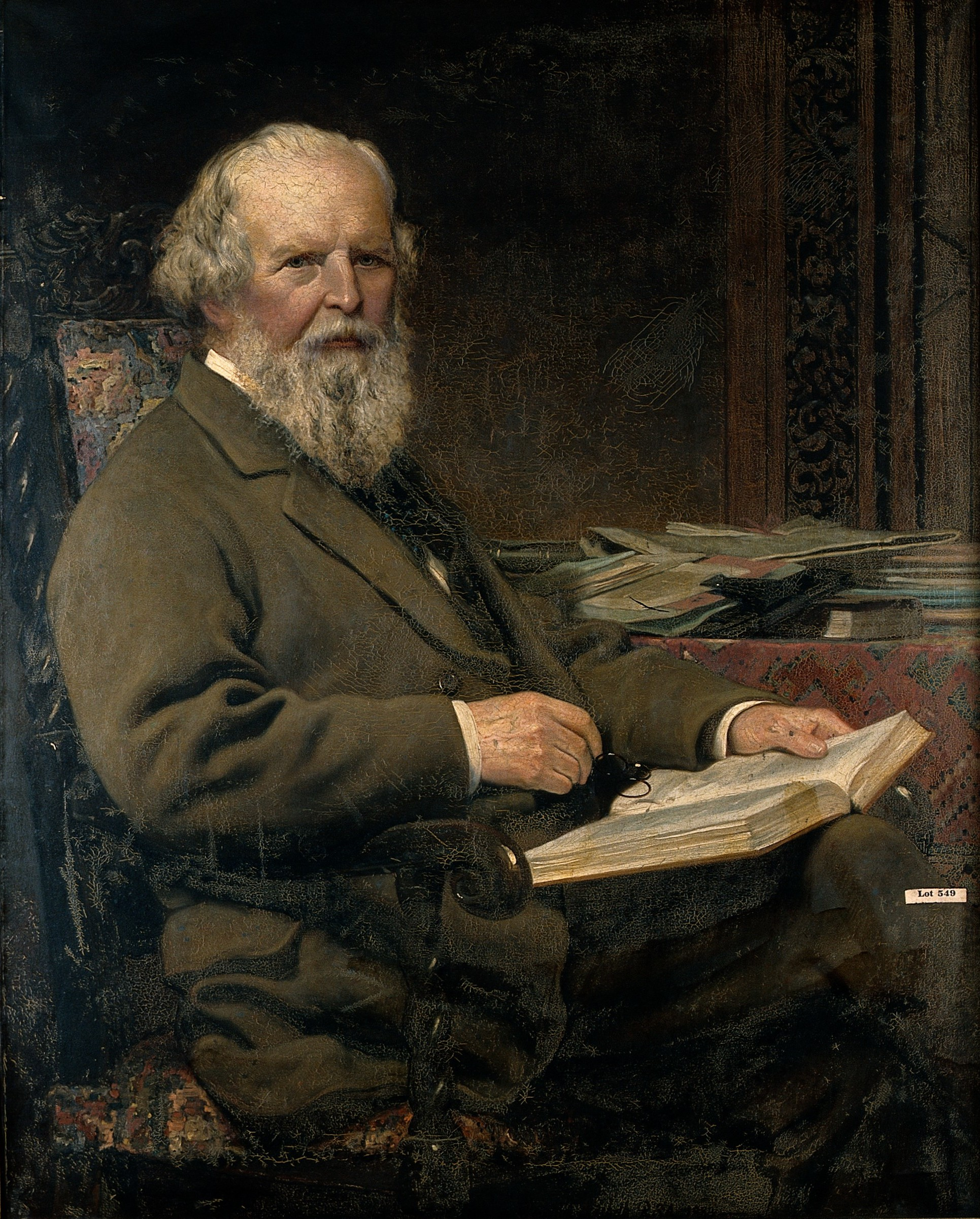
Richard Parnell by Norman Macbeth

Richard Parnell FRSE MWS (4 March 1814–28 October 1882) was a British physician as well as an amateur zoologist, ichthyologist and agrostologist. He gives his name to Parnell's moustached bat. The grass Parnelli is also named after him.

He was born at Bramford Speke in Devon in 1810 the son of John Ratcliffe Parnell (1774-1826). He went to the University of Edinburgh in 1834 to study medicine. He won Professor Robert Graham's gold medal for practical botany and Professor John Lizars' silver medal for anatomy. On 8 February 1836 he was one of the founding members of the Edinburgh Botanical Society. He finished his medical training with postgraduate study in London and Paris.

In 1837 (aged 27) he was elected a Fellow of the Royal Society of Edinburgh, his proposer being Sir William Jardine.

From April 1839 well into 1840 he collected specimens in Jamaica and the West Indies, taking extensive notes and making many illustrations. He also made a tour of the museum collections of the United States.

He returned to Edinburgh in the 1850s living in the Leith area at 7 James Place. He was married to a daughter of James Curle of Evelaw. He died at home, 17 Merchiston Avenue in west Edinburgh on 28 October 1882.

His collection of fish is held by the National Museum of Scotland.

== Publications ==
- Essay on the Natural and Economic History of the Fishes (Marine, Fluviatile and Lacustrine) of the River District of the Firth of Forth (1838)
- The Grasses of Britain vol 1 (1842)
- The Grasses of Britain vol 2 (1845)

The standard author abbreviation Parn. is used to indicate this person as the author when citing a botanical name.
