= Vilhelm Storm =

Norwegian zoologist (1835–1913)

- Born: Vilhelm Ferdinand Johan Storm; 28 September 1835; Arendal, Norway
- Died: 19 May 1913 (aged 77)
- Occupation: zoologist

Vilhelm Storm (28 September 1835 – 19 May 1913) was a Norwegian zoologist and curator at the Royal Norwegian Society of Sciences and Letters (DNKVS). He is known for his pioneering research on the marine life of the Trondheimsfjord, particularly in the deep waters of the fjord, where he made contributions to the understanding of its rich biodiversity.

== Early life and education ==
Vilhelm Storm was born in Arendal, Norway, to Fredrik Elias Storm, a teacher, and his first wife Emilie Fredrikke Cathrine Rønne. He was a cousin of Johan Storm and Gustav Storm. The family moved to Trondheim in 1837 when Fredrik was appointed hospital priest. Storm attended Katedralskolen (Cathedral school) for a year before continuing his studies at the real school, where he graduated in 1852. After his confirmation, he received a two-year scholarship from DKNVS to pursue education in zoology and taxidermy in Kristiania (now Oslo). This marked the beginning of his deep involvement in scientific work.

== Career and contributions ==
In 1856, Storm was appointed curator and preparator at the DKNVS Museum, where he became responsible for the museum's natural history collections. His primary focus was on expanding and organizing the museum's collections of zoological specimens, especially marine invertebrates, reptiles, amphibians, and fish. Storm's dedication to improving the museum's collections earned him considerable recognition, and in 1875, he received much-needed assistance in the form of a new preparator and later additional staff for the various collections.

=== Research on Trondheimsfjord fauna ===
Storm's most notable contribution was his extensive study of the fauna in the deep waters of Trondheimsfjord. In 1872, he began using a dredge to collect specimens from the fjord's depths, revealing an exceptionally rich marine ecosystem. His work provided a more comprehensive understanding of the species inhabiting the deep parts of the fjord, many of which were previously unknown. He published his findings in a series of five papers in DKNVS Skrifter between 1878 and 1883, titled Bidrag til Kundskap om Trondhjemsfjordens Fauna (Contributions to the Knowledge of the Trondheimsfjord Fauna).

Storm's work included descriptions of nearly 200 species of marine invertebrates and a variety of vertebrates. His research on the distribution of species within the fjord was groundbreaking, elucidating its unique position as a zone where Arctic and boreal species coexisted. Many of the species he described were later found to be characteristic of the area, such as the bamboo coral Isidella lofotensis and the scallop Chlamys islandica, the latter of which had disappeared by the 1950s.

== Legacy and recognition ==
Storm's taxonomic work and precise geographic descriptions left a lasting impact on the scientific community. His observations attracted international attention, with many scientists visiting Trondheim to investigate the same localities Storm had studied. The research infrastructure Storm helped establish at the DKNVS Museum and the Trondhjem Biological Station, which opened in 1900, continued to attract researchers throughout the 20th century.

Storm was also instrumental in developing the museum's scientific legacy. His work on cataloging and preparing specimens was praised by his peers, including Professor Georg Ossian Sars, who commended the extensive and well-maintained collections. Storm's research contributed significantly to the development of marine biology in Norway and internationally.

== Death and legacy ==
Vilhelm Storm died on 19 May 1913. He left behind a substantial scientific legacy, including his contributions to marine biology, zoology, and the establishment of the scientific infrastructure at DKNVS. His efforts to document the marine life of Trondheimsfjord are still regarded as foundational to the field.

== Selected publications ==
- Storm, V. (1878). Bidrag til Kundskap om Trondhjemsfjordens Fauna I. DKNVS Skrifter, 9-36.
- Storm, V. (1879). Bidrag til Kundskap om Trondhjemsfjordens Fauna II. DKNVS Skrifter, 109–125.
- Storm, V. (1880). Bidrag til Kundskap om Trondhjemsfjordens Fauna III. DKNVS Skrifter, 73–96.
- Storm, V. (1881). Bidrag til Kundskap om Trondhjemsfjordens Fauna IV. DKNVS Skrifter, 1-30.
- Storm, V. (1883). Bidrag til Kundskap om Trondhjemsfjordens Fauna V. DKNVS Skrifter, 1-48.
