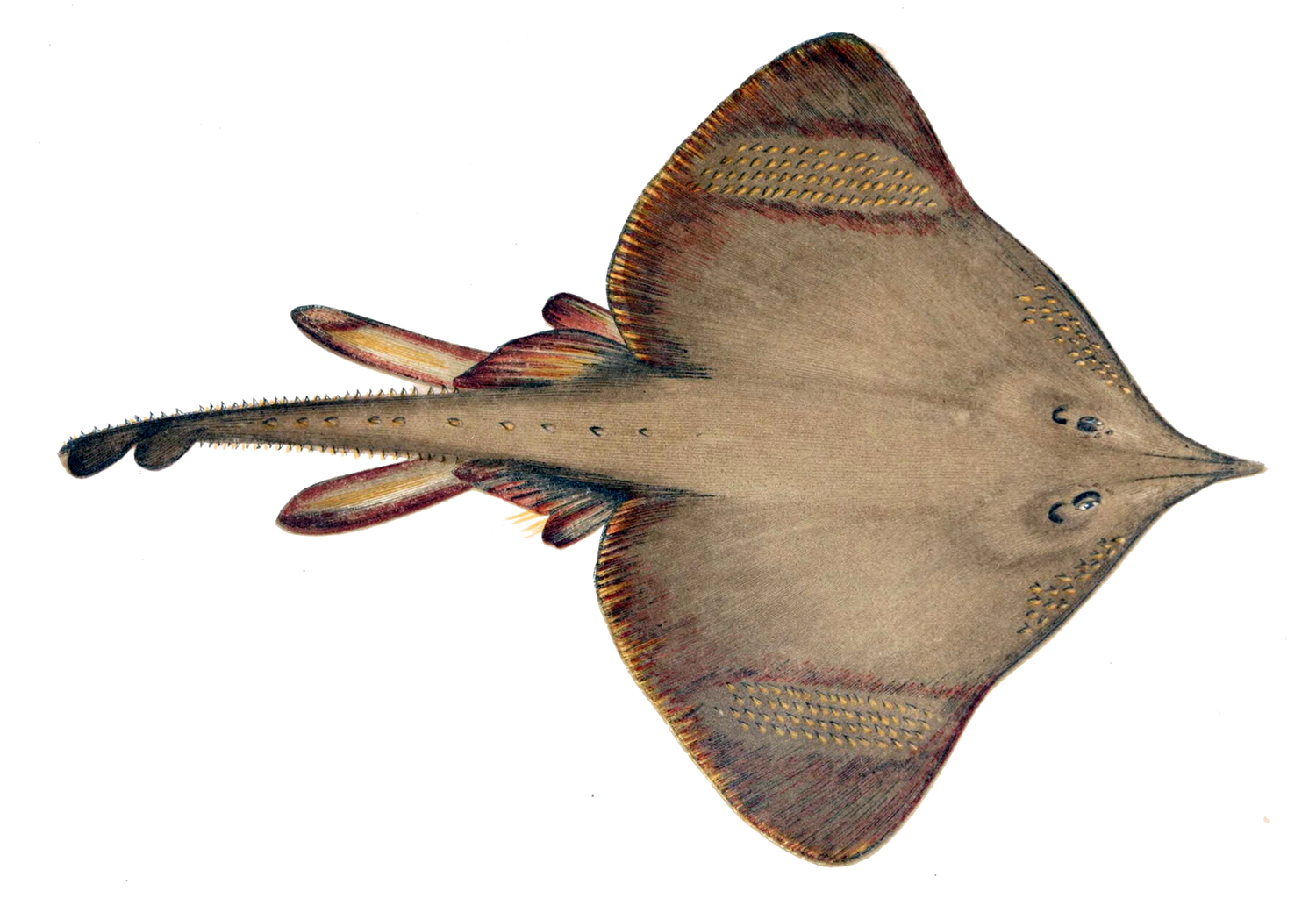

Conservation status
- Vulnerable (IUCN 3.1)

Scientific classification
- Kingdom: Animalia
- Phylum: Chordata
- Class: Chondrichthyes
- Subclass: Elasmobranchii
- Order: Rajiformes
- Family: Rajidae
- Genus: Dipturus
- Species: D. oxyrinchus

Binomial name
- Dipturus oxyrinchus Linnaeus, 1758

Synonyms
- Raja oxyrinchus Linnaeus, 1758

= Dipturus oxyrinchus =

Species of fish

Dipturus oxyrinchus, commonly known as the longnose skate, is a species of skate in the family Rajidae. It can grow up to 1.5 m (4.9 ft) m in length. The species is found in eastern Atlantic Ocean and in the Mediterranean Sea.

== Description ==
The longnose skate is a large skate, featuring a pronounced snout which is long and sharply pointed. It has no thorns on its dorsal disc surface, except in the case of adult males, which have patches of alar thorns. It has a single row of small thorns between its tail and first dorsal fin numbering between 4-11 thorns. Some D. oxyrinchus individuals have a single interdorsal thorn. The longnose skate has 32-42 rows of teeth in its upper and lower jaws. It has sensory pores on both the dorsal and ventral surface, and is covered in a layer of mucus. Juveniles have a light brown-coloured dorsal surface, which grows darker to become dusky brown or grey in larger specimens. The ventral surface similarly changes over time, with juveniles having a light brown colouration while adults have a dark brown or blue-grey colouration.

== Distribution and habitat ==
D. oxyrinchus occurs at depths of 70–1,230 metres (230–4,040 ft), and most commonly is found at a depth of around 200 metres (660 ft). It has been found over substrates of gravel, rock, cobble, sand, and mud. It is resident in the eastern Atlantic from the waters of Norway to Senegal, and is also resident in the Mediterranean. The longnose skate is a demersal and benthic species.

== Biology ==
D. oxyrinchus primarily eats crustaceans and cephalopods, but also benthic invertebrates and fishes. In locating prey, it uses its snout to dig in the seabed. It is oviparous, laying egg cases in the spring or early summer, with females able to lay 10-45 egg cases annually. Gestation lasts between 6-8 months. The egg cases of the longnose skate are large, measuring 11–14 centimetres (4.3–5.5 in) long and 6–10 centimetres (2.4–3.9 in) wide. The total length of D. oxyrinchus at birth is 17 centimetres (6.7 in). The egg case has a brownish to greenish colour when fresh and has developed aprons.

== Conservation ==
D. oxyrinchus is classified as Vulnerable on the IUCN Red List due to the overlap between its distribution and area under intensive pressure from fishing, especially longline fishing, and its current decreasing global population trend.
