= John Higgins Wallace Jr. =

American chemist (1906–1989)

John Higgins Wallace Jr. (August 3, 1906 – March 22, 1989) was the research chemist at Carter-Wallace that formulated Arrid deodorant in 1935.

== Biography ==
He was born on August 3, 1906, in Greenville, Kentucky. He earned bachelor's and doctorate degrees from Princeton University. In 1934 he bought the laboratory where he had been a consulting chemist and named it Wallace Laboratories. It merged with Carter Products to become Carter-Wallace where he developed Arrid deodorant in 1935. He left the company in 1951 to work at Forrestal Research Center where he retired as the director in 1969. He was also president of Princeton Medical Center. He died on March 22, 1989.
