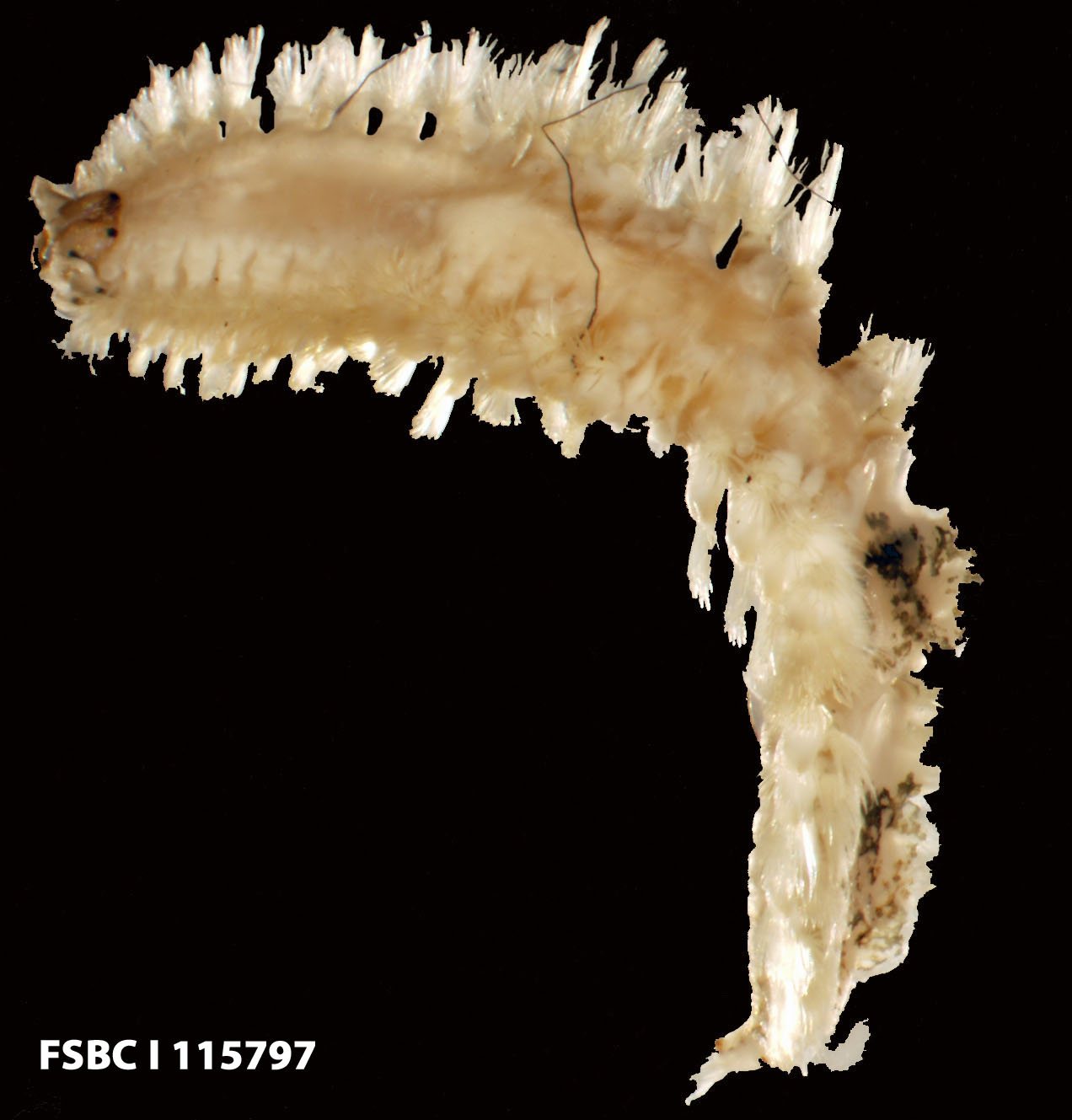
- Harmothoe sp.

Scientific classification
- Kingdom: Animalia
- Phylum: Annelida
- Clade: Pleistoannelida
- Subclass: Errantia
- Order: Phyllodocida
- Family: Polynoidae
- Genus: Harmothoe; Kinberg, 1856

Type species
- Harmothoe spinosa Kinberg, 1856

= Harmothoe =

Genus of annelids

Harmothoe is a genus of marine Polychaete worms belonging to the family Polynoidae (scale worms). Species of Harmothoe are found world-wide to depths of at least 5,000 m but are more common in shallower water.

== Description ==
Body dorsoventrally flattened, short, with 15 pairs of elytra and up to 50 segments; the body is more or less covered by elytra, although long specimens may have a short posterior region uncovered. The prostomium is rounded anteriorly and has distinct cephalic peaks on the dorsal surface. There are three antennae, a pair of lateral antennae inserted ventrally, directly beneath the median antenna ceratophore. The neuropodia are elongate and tapering. The notoochaetae are stout with transverse rows of spines and blunt tips. The neurochaetae also have transverse rows of spines and both unindentate and bidentate neurochaetae are present.

== Biology ==
Harmothoe is one of many genera in the family Polynoidae that contain bioluminescent species.

== Taxonomic comments ==
In many parts of the world, identification of species in this diverse genus is problematic, however recently published revisions provide a guides to species of Harmothoe from the Mediterranean, Northeast Atlantic and from the Subantarctic and Antarctic.

== Species ==
The genus Harmothoe includes 152 species as of June 2020

- Harmothoe abyssicola Bidenkap, 1895
- Harmothoe aculeata Andrews, 1891
- Harmothoe acuminata Willey, 1902
- Harmothoe aequespina (Langerhans, 1884)
- Harmothoe africana Augener, 1918
- Harmothoe africanus (Hartman, 1976)
- Harmothoe anoculata (Hartmann-Schröder, 1975)
- Harmothoe antarctica (McIntosh, 1885)
- Harmothoe antilopes McIntosh, 1876
- Harmothoe areolata (Grube, 1860)
- Harmothoe asiatica Uschakov & Wu, 1962
- Harmothoe aspera (Hansen, 1878)
- Harmothoe assimilis (Örsted, 1843)
- Harmothoe atra Horst, 1915
- Harmothoe augeneri Salazar-Silva, 2010
- Harmothoe australis Kirkegaard, 1995
- Harmothoe balboensis Monro, 1928
- Harmothoe bellani Barnich & Fiege, 2000
- Harmothoe benthaliana McIntosh, 1885
- Harmothoe benthophila Ehlers, 1913
- Harmothoe beringiana Annenkova, 1952
- Harmothoe borealis (Théel, 1879)
- Harmothoe branchiata Hartman, 1976
- Harmothoe campoglacialis Hilbig & Montiel, 2000
- Harmothoe capensis (Willey, 1904)
- Harmothoe capitulifera Ditlevsen, 1911
- Harmothoe casabullicola Brito, Nuñez & Bacallado, 1991
- Harmothoe cascabullicola Brito, Núñez & Bacallado, 1991
- Harmothoe cedrici Barnich, Beuck & Freiwald, 2013
- Harmothoe charlottae Hutchings & Murray, 1984
- Harmothoe ciliata Monro, 1936
- Harmothoe cilielytris Uschakov, 1962
- Harmothoe clavigera (M. Sars, 1863)
- Harmothoe coeliaca de Saint-Joseph, 1888
- Harmothoe commensalis Rozbaczylo & Cañete, 1993
- Harmothoe cornuta (Potts, 1910)
- Harmothoe craigsmithi Pettibone, 1993
- Harmothoe crassicirrata Johnson, 1897
- Harmothoe crosetensis (McIntosh, 1885)
- Harmothoe crucis (Grube, 1856)
- Harmothoe cylindrica Imajima, 1997
- Harmothoe dannyi Barnich, Beuck & Freiwald, 2013
- Harmothoe dearborni Pettibone, 1955
- Harmothoe derjugini (Annenkova, 1937)
- Harmothoe dictyophora (Grube, 1878)
- Harmothoe dinardensis Nolte, 1936
- Harmothoe discoveryae Pettibone, 1993
- Harmothoe eltanina (Hartman, 1967)
- Harmothoe ernesti Augener, 1931
- Harmothoe evei Kirkegaard, 1980
- Harmothoe exanthema (Grube, 1856)
- Harmothoe extenuata (Grube, 1840)
- Harmothoe fernandi Barnich & Fiege, 2009
- Harmothoe flaccida (Potts, 1910)
- Harmothoe forcipata (Marenzeller, 1902)
- Harmothoe fragilis Moore, 1910
- Harmothoe fraserthomsoni McIntosh, 1897
- Harmothoe fuligineum (Baird, 1865)
- Harmothoe fullo (Grube, 1878)
- Harmothoe fusca (McIntosh, 1885)
- Harmothoe fuscaspinae Salazar-Silva, 2003
- Harmothoe gilchristi Day, 1960
- Harmothoe glabra (Malmgren, 1865)
- Harmothoe globifera (Sars G.O., 1873)
- Harmothoe globosa Pettibone, 1990
- Harmothoe glomerosa Imajima, 1997
- Harmothoe gordae Pettibone, 1990
- Harmothoe goreensis Augener, 1918
- Harmothoe grisea (Grube, 1870)
- Harmothoe gruzovi Averincev, 1972
- Harmothoe hanleyi Salazar-Silva, 2010
- Harmothoe helderensis Nolte, 1936
- Harmothoe hirsuta Johnson, 1897
- Harmothoe hollisi Pettibone, 1989
- Harmothoe holothuricola Izuka, 1912
- Harmothoe hyalonemae Martin, Rossel & Uriz, 1992
- Harmothoe imbricata (Linnaeus, 1767)
- Harmothoe impar (Johnston, 1839)
- Harmothoe ingolfiana Ditlevsen, 1917
- Harmothoe johnstoni (McIntosh, 1876)
- Harmothoe joubini Fauvel, 1913
- Harmothoe juvenalis Hartmann-Schröder, 1962
- Harmothoe kieliensis Nolte, 1936
- Harmothoe lanceocirrata Treadwell, 1928
- Harmothoe liaoi Barnich, Sun & Fiege, 2004
- Harmothoe longidentis Salazar-Silva, 2003
- Harmothoe longisetis (Grube, 1863)
- Harmothoe macginitiei Pettibone, 1955
- Harmothoe macnabi Pettibone, 1985
- Harmothoe macquoriensis Averincev, 1978
- Harmothoe macrolepidota (Schmarda, 1861)
- Harmothoe madrynensis Barnich, Orensanz & Fiege, 2012
- Harmothoe magellanica (McIntosh, 1885)
- Harmothoe marerubrum Wehe, 2006
- Harmothoe mariannae Barnich & Fiege, 2009
- Harmothoe melanicornis Britaev, 1981
- Harmothoe meteroae Augener, 1931
- Harmothoe micraspis Eliason, 1962
- Harmothoe muiri Salazar-Silva, 2010
- Harmothoe multisetosa (Moore, 1902)
- Harmothoe norvegica Bidenkap, 1895
- Harmothoe notochaetosa Lopez & San Martín, 1996
- Harmothoe oculinarum (Storm, 1879)
- Harmothoe ornatus (Hartman, 1967)
- Harmothoe pagenstecheri Michaelsen, 1896
- Harmothoe panamensis Kirkegaard, 1995
- Harmothoe paraminuta Hartmann-Schröder, 1984
- Harmothoe paxtoni Averincev, 1978
- Harmothoe pentactae (Giard, 1886)
- Harmothoe picta Saint-Joseph, 1888
- Harmothoe pokoui Intes & Le Loeuff, 1975
- Harmothoe praeclara (Haswell, 1883)
- Harmothoe profunda Day, 1963
- Harmothoe propinqua (Malmgren, 1867)
- Harmothoe pulchella (Kinberg, 1856)
- Harmothoe quadriceps Grube in Augener, 1922
- Harmothoe quadrituberculata Augener, 1922
- Harmothoe rarispina (M. Sars, 1861)
- Harmothoe reticulata (Claparède, 1870)
- Harmothoe rottnestensis Hanley, 1993
- Harmothoe ruthae Miranda & Brasil, 2014
- Harmothoe saldanha Day, 1953
- Harmothoe sanctaehelenae Day, 1949
- Harmothoe serrata Day, 1963
- Harmothoe setosissima (Lamarck, 1818)
- Harmothoe sexdentata (Marenzeller, 1902)
- Harmothoe sinensis Barnich, Sun & Fiege, 2004
- Harmothoe spinifera (Ehlers, 1864)
- Harmothoe spinosa Kinberg, 1856
- Harmothoe spongicola Hanley & Burke, 1991
- Harmothoe stephensoni Pettibone, 1993
- Harmothoe sylliformia Treadwell, 1928
- Harmothoe synaptae Saint-Joseph, 1906
- Harmothoe tahitiensis Pettibone, 1993
- Harmothoe talismani Roule, 1898
- Harmothoe tenuisetis (McIntosh, 1885)
- Harmothoe triannulata Moore, 1910
- Harmothoe tridestinensis Nolte, 1936
- Harmothoe trimaculata (Treadwell, 1924)
- Harmothoe turbinata Hanley & Burke, 1991
- Harmothoe vagabunda Pettibone, 1985
- Harmothoe vesiculosa Ditlevsen, 1917
- Harmothoe villosa Treadwell, 1926
- Harmothoe vinogradovae Averincev, 1978
- Harmothoe viridis Loshamn, 1981
- Harmothoe viscayensis Nolte, 1936
- Harmothoe vittata Trautsch, 1889
- Harmothoe vossae Salazar-Silva, 2003
- Harmothoe waahli (Kinberg, 1856)
- Harmothoe watsoni McIntosh, 1919
- Harmothoe westoni Salazar-Silva, 2010
- Harmothoe yendoi Izuka, 1912
