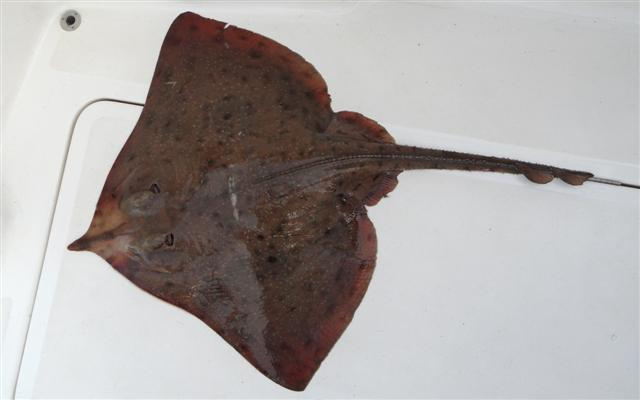

Conservation status
- Endangered (IUCN 3.1)

Scientific classification
- Kingdom: Animalia
- Phylum: Chordata
- Class: Chondrichthyes
- Subclass: Elasmobranchii
- Order: Rajiformes
- Family: Rajidae
- Genus: Rostroraja
- Species: R. alba

Binomial name
- Rostroraja alba (Lacépède, 1803)

Synonyms
- Raja alba Lacepède, 1803; Raja bicolor Shaw, 1804; Raja bramante Sassi, 1846; Raja marginata Lacepède, 1803; Raja rostellata Risso, 1810

= Bottlenose skate =

Species of cartilaginous fish

The bottlenose skate, spearnose skate, or white skate (Rostroraja alba) is a species of skate in the family Rajidae. It is a benthic fish native to the coastal eastern Atlantic Ocean. Due to overfishing, it has been depleted or extirpated in many parts of its former range in the northeastern Atlantic and the Mediterranean Sea, and is now endangered.

== Distribution and habitat ==
The bottlenose skate is found along the coastlines of the eastern Atlantic Ocean, from southwest Ireland to South Africa and extends into the southwestern Indian Ocean to Mozambique. It is present as well in the western and northeastern sectors of the Mediterranean Sea. It is a benthic species of sandy and detrital bottoms, at depths of 40–400 m (exceptionally down to 500 m) from coastal regions to the upper continental slope. Du Buit (1974) reported that it is more prevalent in rocky habitats.

== Description ==
Most bottlenose skates are 60–150 cm (24–59 in) long, with maximum recorded lengths of 230 cm (91 in) for males and 202 cm (80 in) for females. The flattened, angular pectoral fin fisc is about 1.4–1.5 times as broad as long. The snout is broad-based, abruptly tapering to a protruding sharp point and covered with small, sharp thorns. There are 40–45 rows of teeth in the upper jaw. The juveniles have 1 thorn before and 0–1 thorns behind the eyes and three rows of large thorns on the tail, 10–16 on the midline and 7–17 on either side. The adults have about 6 thorns around the inner margin of the orbit and 16–30 mid-dorsal and 17–29 lateral thorns on the tail. The skin is rough in adults except for a smooth patch in the center of the disc; the underside is prickly except for smooth patches on the snout. The young are entirely smooth, except for on the snout. Large juveniles and adults are greyish or bluish with or without numerous small white spots above, white below with brown to black disc margins. Hatchlings are plain reddish-brown above, often with blue spots, and white below with broad dusky disc margins.

== Biology and ecology ==
The bottlenose skate is a benthic predator of bony fishes, other elasmobranchs, fish offal, crabs, shrimps, mysids, octopus, and cuttlefish. Younger, smaller fish are usually found in shallower water. Like other skates, this species is oviparous, with females producing 55–156 ova per year after a gestation period of 15 months. The egg cases are oblong in shape, with stiff pointed horns at each corners and the larger horns flattened. They are deposited in sandy or muddy flats in the spring. The capsules measure 12.5–18.3 cm (4.9–7.2 in) long and 10–13.9 cm (3.9–5.5 in) wide. This species is estimated to mature at 130 cm (51 in) for males and 120 cm (47 in) for females.

== Relationship to humans ==
In the 17th century, the bottlenose skate was prized by the French for food. Because of its large size and slow reproductive rate, the bottlenose skate is extremely vulnerable to exploitation by fisheries. Anecdotal data suggests that there has been a substantial decline in the abundance and geographical range of this species in the north Atlantic and Mediterranean. In the north Atlantic, populations of bottlenose skates have declined severely or disappeared from the Bay of Biscay and the Irish Sea; there are no longer targeted fisheries in these regions due to localized population collapses in the 1960s. There are also no recent records of this species in the waters off the Britain. However, in the southwest of Ireland, it is still quite common. The bottlenose ray also still persists along the coast of the Iberian Peninsula, though the population data is uncertain due to confusion with the shagreen ray (Leucoraja fullonica) and the sandy ray (L. circularis).

In the Mediterranean, bottlenose skates of most size classes down to egg cases are taken as by-catch in multi-species trawling fisheries. Historically, it was caught frequently off the coasts of Tunisia and Morocco in the 1970s and was described as more or less frequent in the northwestern Mediterranean from the 1950s to the 1970s. The MEDITS trawl surveys, begun in 1985 and carried out six times a year in four geographic regions, indicates that the bottlenose skate is now very rare in the Mediterranean and that it has been reduced to a small fraction of its former range. The Italian National Group for Demersal Resource Evaluation (GRUND) survey captured this species infrequently in the Adriatic Sea. The species is assessed globally as Endangered in the IUCN Red List, and Critically Endangered in the northeast Atlantic. However, its status will require re-evaluation once data from its African range is available. In 2010, Greenpeace International added the bottlenose skate to its Seafood Red List, which includes commonly marketed species that "have a very high risk of being sourced from unsustainable fisheries".
