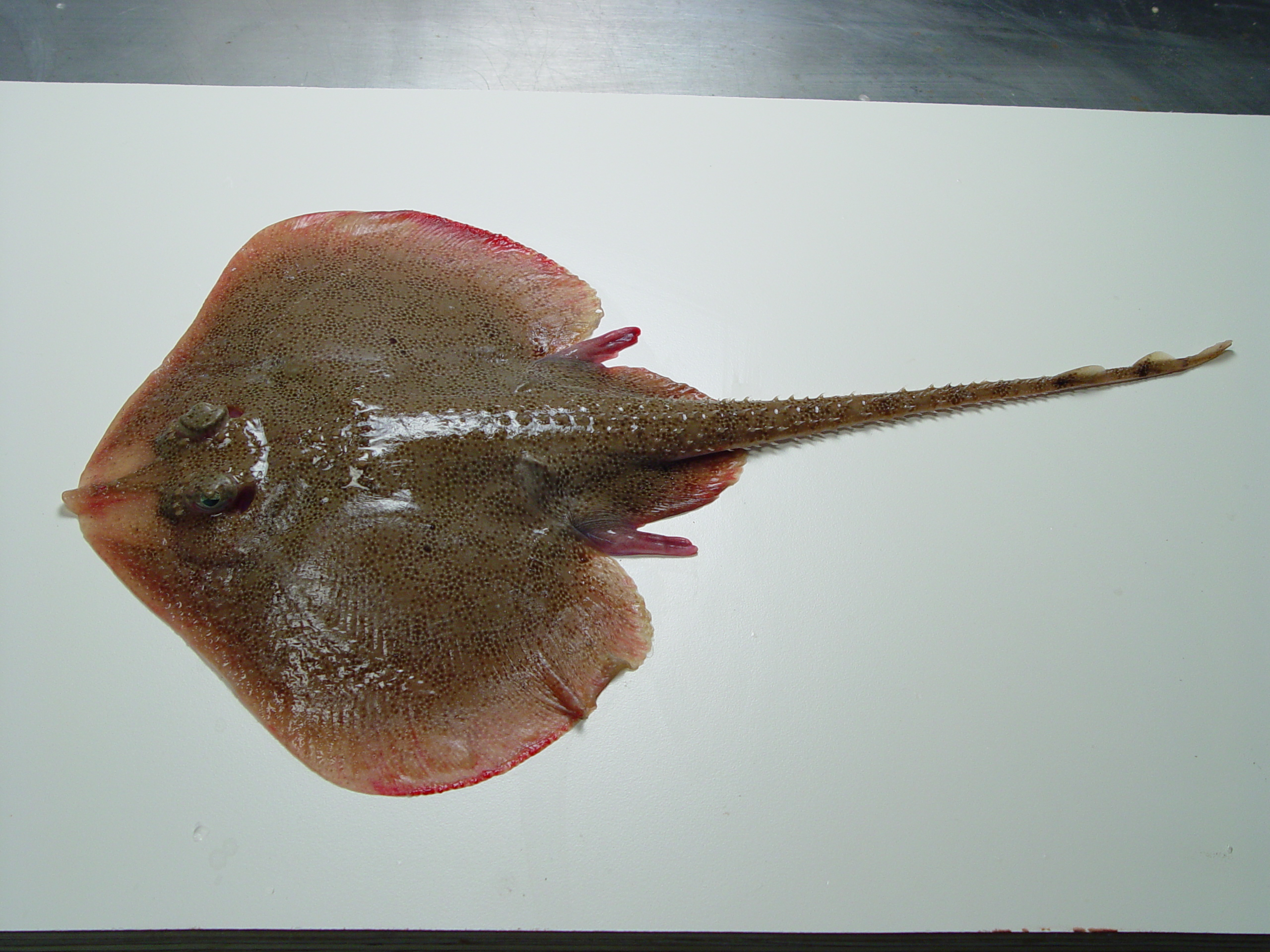

Conservation status
- Least Concern (IUCN 3.1)

Scientific classification
- Kingdom: Animalia
- Phylum: Chordata
- Class: Chondrichthyes
- Subclass: Elasmobranchii
- Order: Rajiformes
- Family: Rajidae
- Genus: Leucoraja
- Species: L. lentiginosa

Binomial name
- Leucoraja lentiginosa (Bigelow & Schroeder, 1951)

Synonyms
- Raja lentiginosa Bigelow & Schroeder, 1951

= Leucoraja lentiginosa =

Species of fish

Leucoraja lentiginosa, the freckled skate, is a species of hardnose skate.

== Description ==
It is most similar to, and often confused with Leucoraja garmani.

== Habitat ==
It has been observed on iNaturalist near Galveston and Gulf Shores. They are demersal and are found in the depth range of 53–588 m (170–1,930 ft).
