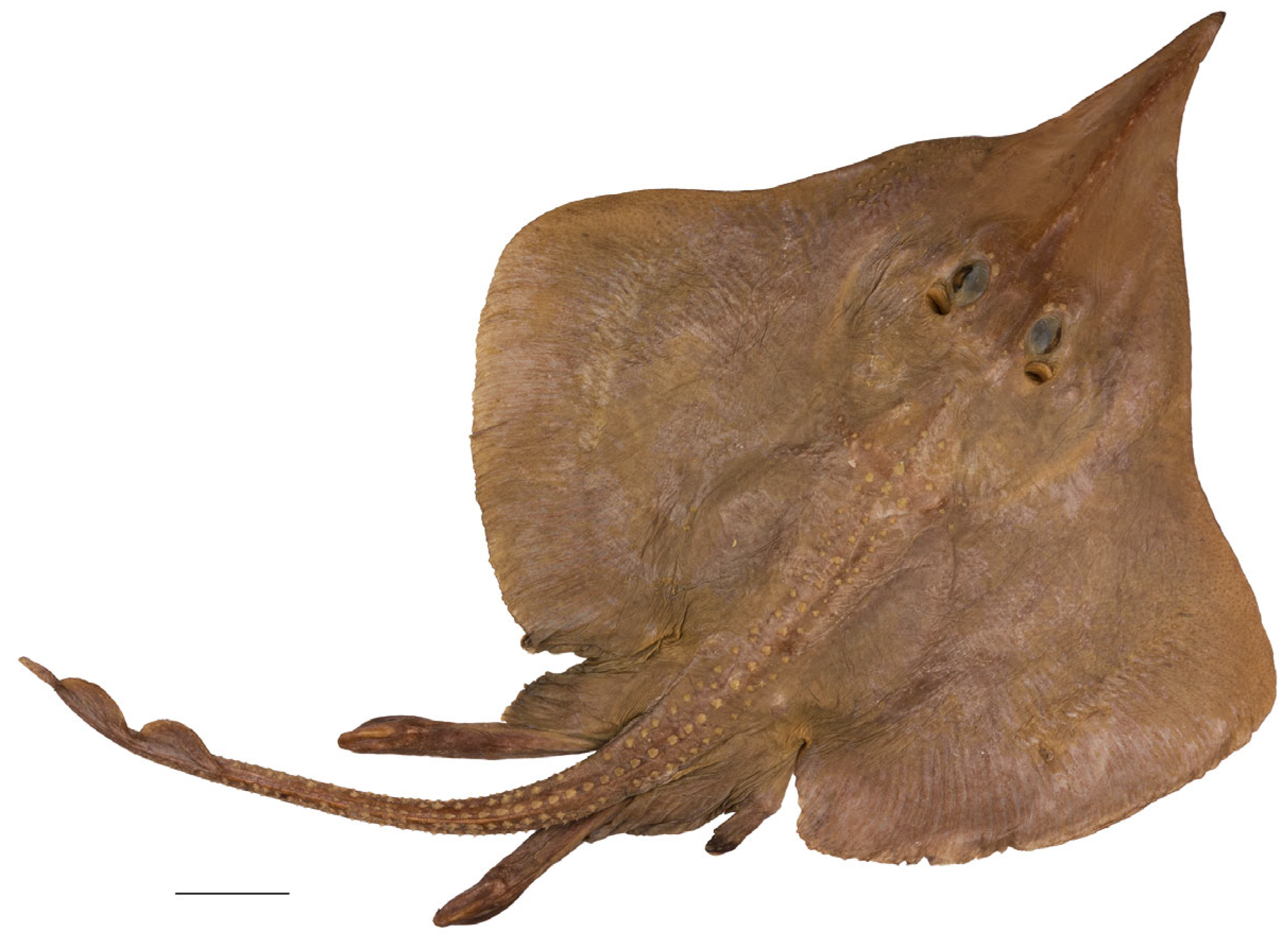

Conservation status
- Data Deficient (IUCN 3.1)

Scientific classification
- Kingdom: Animalia
- Phylum: Chordata
- Class: Chondrichthyes
- Subclass: Elasmobranchii
- Order: Rajiformes
- Family: Rajidae
- Genus: Leucoraja
- Species: L. longirostris

Binomial name
- Leucoraja longirostris Weigmann, Stehmann, Séret & Ishihara 2024

= Leucoraja longirostris =

Species of cartilaginous fish

Leucoraja longirostris, the brown longnose skate, is a medium-sized species of the genus Leucoraja with disc rhombic to (in adult male) evenly inverse heart-shaped, with broadly rounded outer corners and with body length to mid-vent about equal to tail length from mid-vent. Preorbital snout length 17.2–22.3% TL and distance between first gill slits 11.6–12.9% of TL. Orbits moderately large, horizontal diameter 1.0–1.2 times interorbital width. Dorsal disc largely devoid of denticles, ventrally spinules at least on snout tip. Thorn pattern pronounced with ~5–20 rostral thorns, a half ring of 3–5 thorns on each orbital rim, 1 supraspiracular and 1 interspiracular thorn per side, 3–5 median nuchal thorns, 0–3 lateral nuchal thorns per side, 1–2 suprascapular thorns, 0–2 lateral scapular thorns, 2–3 scapular thorns per side, a median row of 34–41 thorns from behind the shoulder girdle to just before the origin of the first dorsal fin, no interdorsal thorns, and 2–4 parallel rows of thorns on tail. When fresh, dorsal surface plain medium-brown, with grayish mucus coverage; ventral side plain grayish on disc and pelvic fins, snout dusky grayish, sensory pores not marked dark. Bases of nearly equal-sized and long but low dorsal fins confluent or with short interspace of maximally 0.8% TL. Postdorsal tail section short, 2.5–3.8% TL, with low epichordal caudal lobe, which is confluent with the second dorsal fin. Brownish lateral tail folds along posterior 58.1–72.0% of tail. Upper jaw tooth rows 41–49, pectoral-fin radials 69–73, pelvic-fin radials 3 + 15–3 + 18. Clasper lacking external pseudosiphon; inner dorsal lobe with components roll, promontory, slit, and two clefts; inner ventral lobe with components shield, rhipidion, pent, sentinel, spike, and dike. Terminal clasper skeleton with four dorsal terminal cartilages, a ventral terminal, and two accessory terminal cartilages, plus a tiny separate spindle-shaped fibrocartilage between distal tips of dorsal terminal 1 and ventral terminal. Anterior cranial fontanelle with clear-cut contour all around and extending only about one fifth into rostral shaft length. Scapulocoracoid subquadratic, rear corner poorly developed, large oval anterior fenestra without anterior bridge, one moderately large, oval postdorsal and postventral fenestra, respectively. Pelvic girdle with massive ischiopubic bar with nearly straight anterior and deeply concave posterior contour; prepelvic processes short, solid, conical, and somewhat inclined outwards, their length 1.7–2.9 times median thickness of ischiopubic bar. The new species differs from all congeners in the remarkably long and acutely angled snout (horizontal preorbital length 17.2–22.6% TL vs. 8.5–11.9% TL and 4.2–6.1 vs. 1.7–3.5 times orbit length, snout angle 65–85◦ vs. 90–150◦). The new species is apparently endemic to the Madagascar Ridge, distant from the known distribution areas of all congeners by more than 1000 km. In addition to L. fullonica and L. pristispina, L. longirostris n. sp. is also the only species with plain dorsal coloration. Furthermore, the new species is the only Leucoraja species with external clasper component dike and, besides L. wallacei, the only one with four dorsal terminal cartilages. The shape of the accessory terminal 1 cartilage with four tips is also unique within the genus.

It is from southern end of the Madagascar Ridge at Walters Shoals. It reaches at least 711 mm total length and has a depth range of 750–1050 meters. The dentition is 43 (39–50) close-set parallel tooth rows in upper jaw; individual tooth with low, subcircular base and elongated, conically pointed cusp. The cusps are short and stout in all female and juvenile male paratypes and intermediately elongated in early subadult male specimen.
