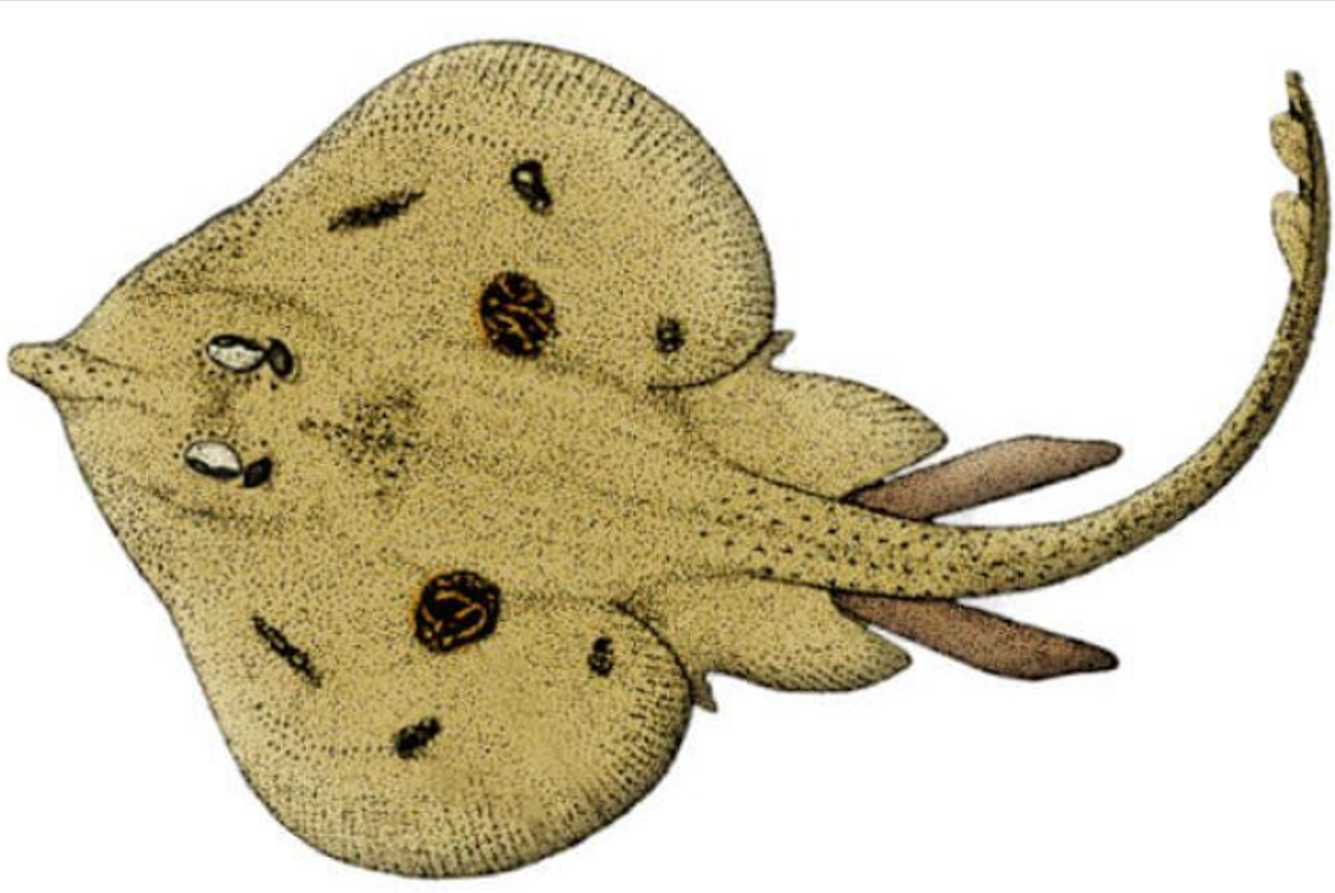

Conservation status
- Critically Endangered (IUCN 3.1)

Scientific classification
- Kingdom: Animalia
- Phylum: Chordata
- Class: Chondrichthyes
- Subclass: Elasmobranchii
- Order: Rajiformes
- Family: Rajidae
- Genus: Leucoraja
- Species: L. melitensis

Binomial name
- Leucoraja melitensis (R. S. Clark, 1926)

Synonyms
- Raja melitensis Clark, 1926

= Maltese skate =

Species of fish

The Maltese skate (Leucoraja melitensis), or Maltese ray, is a species of cartilaginous fish belonging to the family Rajidae. It is one of three rare endemic skate species originating from the Mediterranean Sea. As a demersal (bottom-dwelling) species, it inhabits the seafloor, which makes it highly prone to becoming bycatch during commercial fishing. Bycatch, also known as when non-target marine species are caught unintentionally, poses a serious threat to the Maltese skate and is responsible for its status under the imminent threat of extinction.

== Description ==
The Maltese skate is a relatively small skate in comparison to other skates in the Rajidae family. At adulthood, the total length ranges from 14–45 cm (5.5–17.7 in) for females and 10–52 cm (3.9–20.5 in) for males. The maximum length of a Maltese skate is around 50 cm (20 in), while other Rajidae skates can grow up to 120 cm (47 in) in length.

The snout on its head is short, pronounced, and pointed. The front edges of the skate’s anterior (frontal) disc margins have a wavy (undulated) outline and the pectoral fins are rounded. This allows the skate to swim efficiently by generating oscillations to glide in the water. Skates have a laterally depressed, rounded pectoral disk shape that allows it to swim near the seafloor and bury itself in mud and sand. The tail length is slightly longer than the length of the disc and lacks spines between the two dorsal fins on the tail. There are 6-8 small spines around the eyes, which are referred to as orbital thorns. On the back of the head, there are 4 nuchal thorns. Around the nape and shoulder area, there is a small triangular patch of thorns. Running along the length of the tail to the first dorsal fin on the back, there are 3 to 5 irregular parallel rows of thorns. The underside, also referred to as the ventral surface, is smooth with some prickles along the anterior disc margin, which is located along the front edge. Like other skates, it has an inferior mouth on the ventral surface. It has five pairs of ventral gill slits, but they rely on spiracles to breathe when buried under the sand. Spiracles are located around the eyes and actively draw water into gill chambers, which is a favored method of respiration. Similarly to other elasmobranchs, the Maltese skate has well-developed sensing organs for electric fields, which are referred to as Ampullae of Lorenzini. These jelly-filled pores allow them to detect weak electric fields from prey. Electric organs are paired structures located on the tail also present in species belonging to the Rajidae family, which are primarily used for communication.

The diagnostic feature of the Maltese skate is the circular ocelli with indistinct dusk coloration on the light brown dorsal surface of the skate. Ocelli are markings that resemble eyes, which act as a defense mechanism to deter or confuse predators. On both wings, there are around 3-4 brown spots with yellow centers. The ventral surface is white and becomes more pale brown to greyish at the margins. The upper jaw of the Maltese skate has 51-59 rows of small and flattened teeth, while the lower jaw has 51-56 rows.

== Distribution and habitat ==
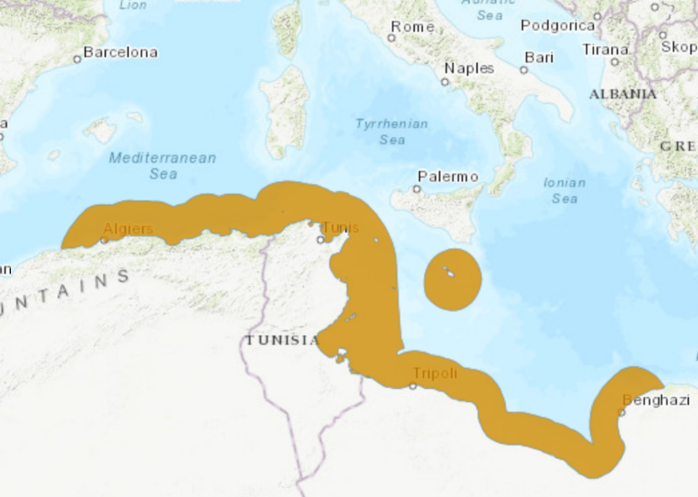
Figure 1: Distribution of L. melitensis, depicted around the Strait of Sicily.

Sightings of the Maltese skate are extremely rare, only recorded in 20 hauls out of 6336 total in north Mediterranean broadscale surveys. In the 2012-2015 MEDITS surveys conducted by the General Fisheries Commission for the Mediterranean (GFCM), the Maltese skate was only found in two geographic sub-areas (GSAs): GSA16 and GSA22, which is the Strait of Sicily and the Aegean areas, respectively. Maltese skates are found in a wide range of depths, from the surface of the sea to as far down as 800 metres (2,620 ft). They are commonly found on the outer continental shelves and upper slopes from 400–800 metres (1,310–2,620 ft), in addition to muddy and sandy seabeds.

Although sightings of the Maltese skate have been reported on the Algerian coast previously, no specimens were available for confirmation, which led to doubt that the species resided there. This may lead to speculation that the Maltese skate only occasionally appear in this area. The Maltese skate is reported to be restricted to the continental shelf of the Mediterranean Sea, but sightings of this skate in Greece is unlikely and must have been confused with the Cuckoo ray (Leucoraja naevus).

Knowledge of habitat for endemic elasmobranchs, including the Maltese skate, is still limited and unknown. The lack of data makes it difficult to determine the best methods that should be utilized for management and conservation for this species.

== Life history and development ==
Like other species in the Rajidae family, the Maltese skate is iteroparous, meaning they reproduce multiple times throughout its life cycle. Annually, females deposit around 10-56 egg cases during their breeding season, which ranges from spring to autumn.

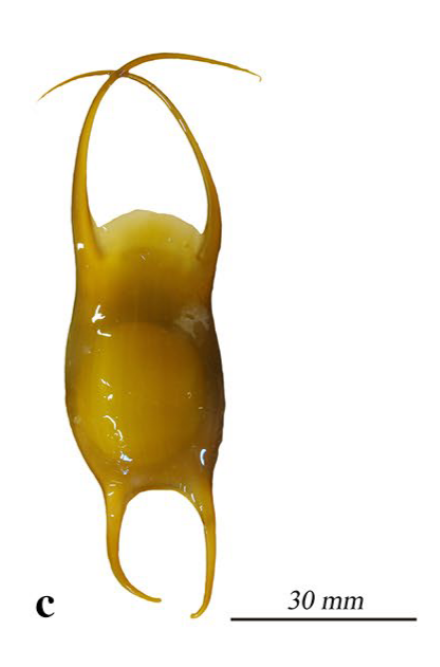
Figure 2: Eggcase of L. melitensis

Skate egg cases are commonly referred to as “mermaid purses” and have the general appearance of a leathery, rectangular case made out of keratin. Maltese skate egg cases are about 4–8 centimetres (1.6–3.1 in) long and 2–6 centimetres (0.79–2.36 in) wide, but it varies based upon the size of the female and region. The color of the case is yellowish with brown hues. The length of the anterior (upper) apron is longer than the posterior (lower) apron. The intersecting anterior horns are thin and about 103.9% longer than the total egg case length, which is a diagnostic feature of Maltese skate cases. The anterior horns act as an anchor to the seafloor to prevent the egg case from drifting away. The posterior horns are a moderate length with similar thickness to the anterior horns, but do not intersect. It is common for chondrichthyes egg cases to have flexible lateral keels along the outer edge as structural reinforcement, but these are not present in Maltese skate egg cases. The surface of the egg case appears smooth and has no external fibers covering the surface.

When the young skate emerges from the anterior apron, they are approximately 9 cm (3.5 in) in length. The Maltese skate is capable of growing over 30 cm (12 in) in total length during the first two years of its life cycle but spends up to four years increasing less than 10 cm (3.9 in) in length. The median thorns located on the trunk and tail become reduced and completely disappear as the skate ages. As the median thorns disappear, parallel rows of thorns emerge and remain for the rest of the skate’s life. There is no data on the average lifespan of a Maltese skate, and the life-history traits are not well-known due to limited population data.

== Feeding behavior ==
The Maltese skate diet consists largely of small benthic invertebrates, including crustaceans and plankton. The small, pointed rows of teeth in its inferior mouth allows it to capture prey with ease. Like other skates, they use a common feeding strategy that involves burying itself partially in the sand to camouflage itself before ambushing its prey. The morphology of the Maltese skate, including the depressed body shape and the spiracles allow the skate to effectively use this feeding strategy.

== Conservation status ==
The Maltese skate was once found over a relatively restricted area in about one-fourth of the total area of the Mediterranean Sea but now appears to be restricted to the Sicilian channel. This species was caught in relative abundance (around 674 specimens) in Tunisia between 1970 and 1975, but is either rare or absent in this area in the present day.

The IUCN conservation status of the Maltese skate has been evaluated as “Critically Endangered.” The population of this specific skate in the Rajidae family has declined more than 80% due to its vulnerability as bycatch by bottom-trawl activity. Bottom-trawling is a fishing method that involves dragging a fishing net along the seafloor, which indiscriminately catches bottom-dwelling species. From 1995-2000 and 2003-2006 in the Mediterranean Sea, approximately 151 specimens of Maltese skates were caught in bottom-trawl hauls and identified as bycatch. It is important to recognize that self-reported bycatch counts can be misleading because the survival of the organism is not guaranteed once it is removed from the water. Even when discarded back into water, the skate may not survive due to physical trauma, pressure changes (barotrauma), or higher susceptibility to predation.

Further information is needed on the biology, distribution, ecology, and exploitation to urgently protect the further decline of this species.

== Sustainable consumption ==
The Maltese skate is not a species sought after for consumption, Greenpeace International added this species to its seafood red list in 2010. "The Greenpeace International seafood red list is a list of fish that are commonly sold in supermarkets around the world, and which have a very high risk of being sourced from unsustainable fisheries." Species on this list must meet one of three criteria for a species to be included: a life history that makes them vulnerable to fishing with little to no data to show the stocks are healthy and fished at a sustainable rate, commonly sourced from overfished stocks, or the use of highly destructive fishing practices to capture fish.
