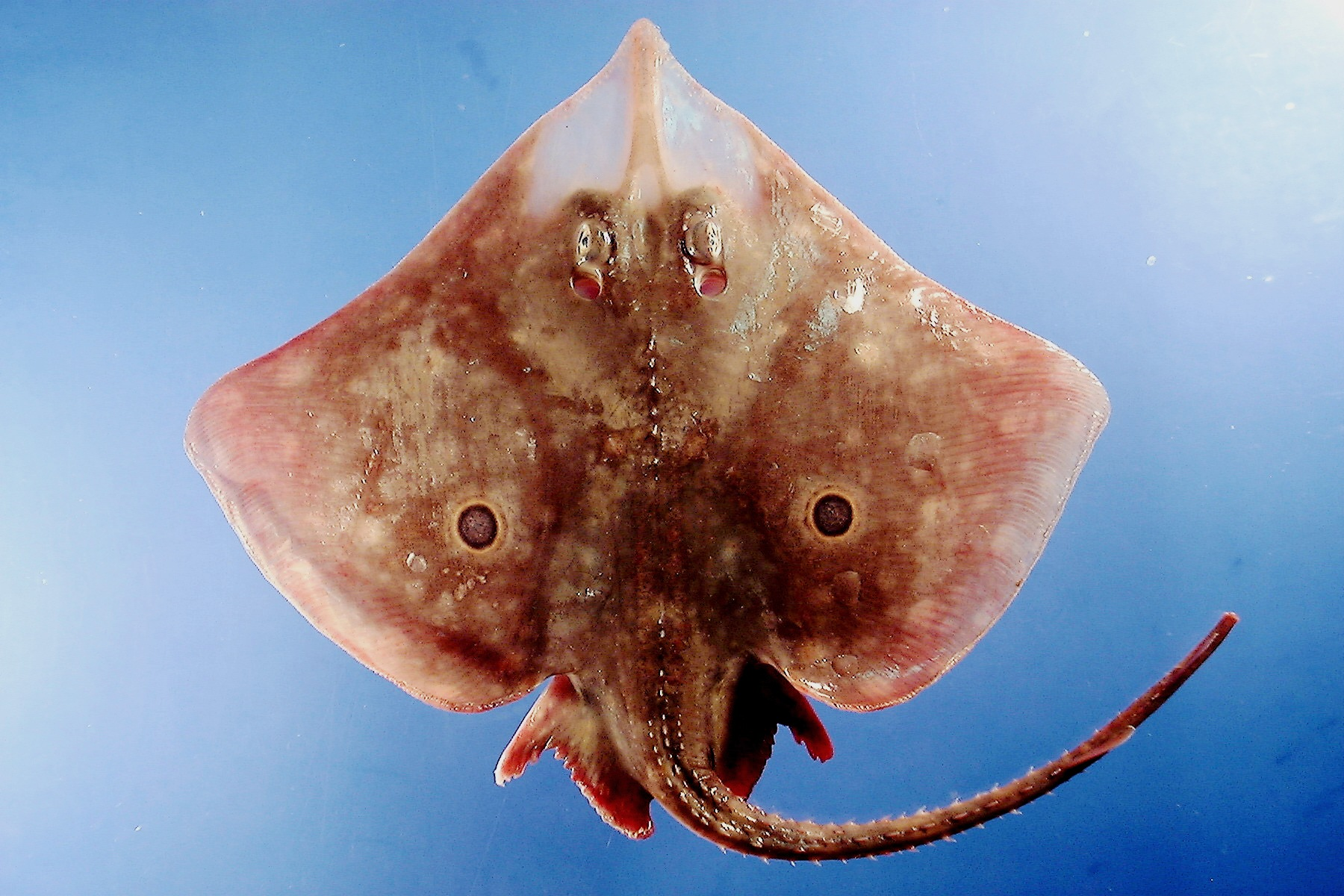

Conservation status
- Least Concern (IUCN 3.1)

Scientific classification
- Kingdom: Animalia
- Phylum: Chordata
- Class: Chondrichthyes
- Subclass: Elasmobranchii
- Order: Rajiformes
- Family: Rajidae
- Genus: Rostroraja
- Species: R. texana

Binomial name
- Rostroraja texana (Chandler, 1921)

Synonyms
- Raia texana Chandler, 1921; Raja texana Chandler, 1921

= Rostroraja texana =

Species of cartilaginous fish

Rostroraja texana, the roundel skate or Texas clearnose skate, is a species of cartilaginous fish in the family Rajidae. It is found in the Gulf of Mexico, Southeast Florida and the Yucatan Peninsula.

== Description ==
The disc of the roundel skate is diamond shaped. The short, rounded snout has a clear area of skin on either side. The rest of the dorsal surface is an unblotched chocolate brown colour, although sometimes there are darker patches. A pair of distinctive dark eyespots with pale pink rims lie on either side of the middle of the dorsal surface (these may confuse potential predators). A row of thorns runs along the midline of the back, but there are no venomous spines. The medium-length tail has a short dorsal fin near its tip and a small caudal fin. Males become mature at about 5 years old at a length of about 44 centimetres (17 in), while females are mature a year later at a length of about 53 centimetres (21 in).

== Distribution and habitat ==
The roundel skate is native to the southeastern coast of Florida, the Gulf of Mexico and the Campeche Bank, a shallow area of sea off the northern coast of the Yucatan Peninsula. It usually occurs on sand, crushed shell or shingle to depths of about 180 metres (590 ft).

== Biology ==
Adult roundel skates feed predominantly on shrimp (65%), but also take fish (25%) and sometimes crabs and other crustaceans. The diet of juveniles is over 90% shrimp, with the rest composed of small fish.

The roundel skate is sexually dimorphic, with the males usually being smaller than the females. In reproduction, the male's claspers are inserted into the female's cloaca, and fertilisation is internal. As the fertilised egg passes down the uterus, albumen and yolk are added and it is placed in a rectangular collagenous egg case known as a mermaid's purse. This is pale brown, flat on one side and rounded on the other, with tendrils at the corners. The developing embryo feeds on the yolk, and some months later emerges as a fully formed juvenile fish about 11 centimetres (4.3 in) long.

== Status ==
The IUCN has classified this fish as "Least Concern" in its Red List of Threatened Species.
