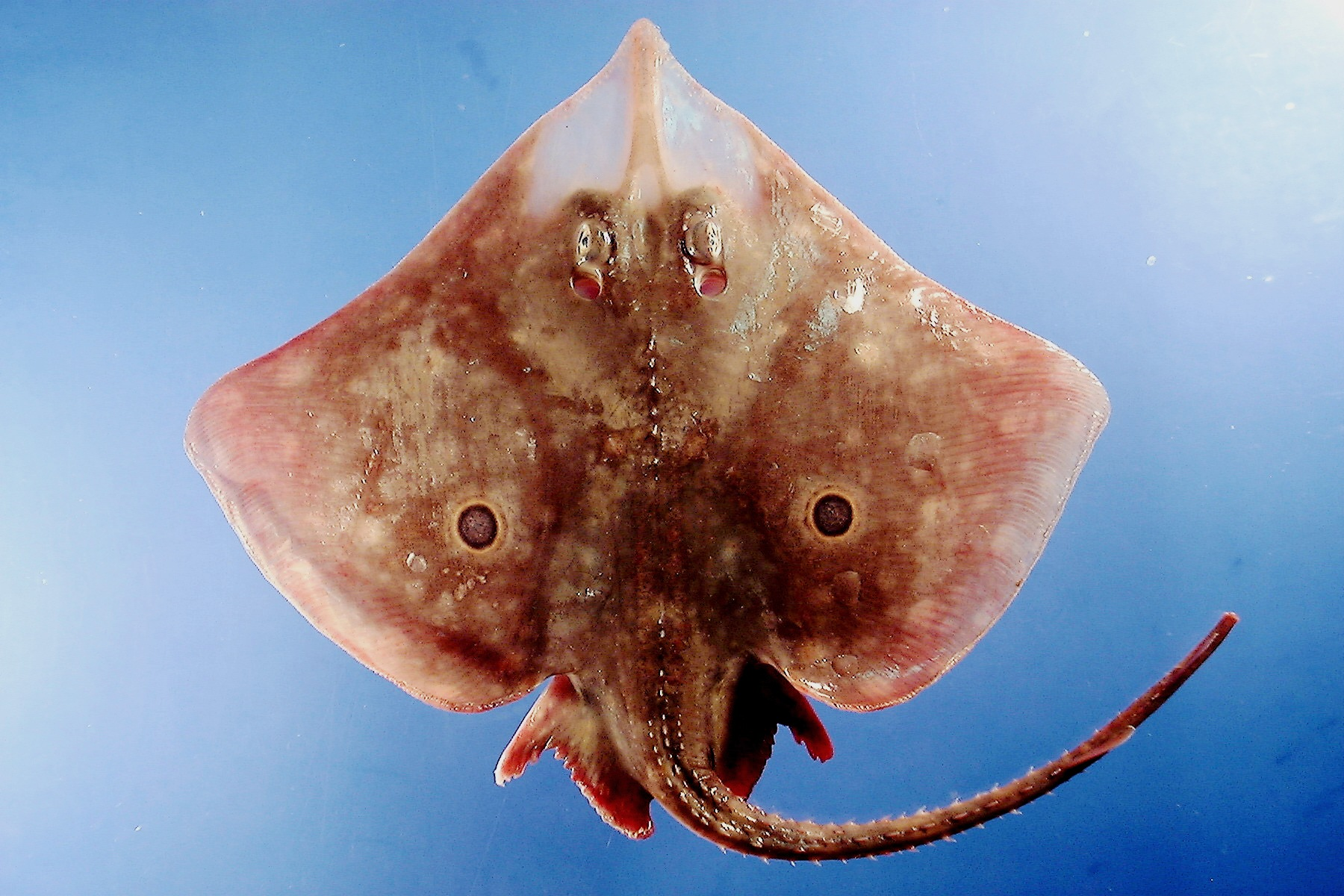
- Rostroraja texana

Scientific classification
- Kingdom: Animalia
- Phylum: Chordata
- Class: Chondrichthyes
- Subclass: Elasmobranchii
- Order: Rajiformes
- Family: Rajidae
- Genus: Rostroraja; Hulley, 1972

Type species
- Raja alba Lacépède, 1803

= Rostroraja =

Genus of cartilaginous fishes

Rostroraja is a genus of skate belonging to the family Rajidae, native to the Atlantic Ocean and East Pacific, including the Mediterranean, Caribbean, Gulf of Mexico and Gulf of California. The genus was considered monotypic in the past (containing only R. alba), but a number of species usually classified in Raja have been reassigned to this genus based on genetic analysis.

== Species ==
There are eight recognized species in the genus:

- Rostroraja ackleyi (Garman, 1881) (ocellate skate)
- Rostroraja alba (Lacépède, 1803) (bottlenose skate)
- Rostroraja bahamensis (Bigelow & Schroeder, 1965) (Bahama skate)
- Rostroraja cervigoni (Bigelow & Schroeder, 1964) (finspot ray)
- Rostroraja eglanteria (L. A. G. Bosc, 1800) (clearnose skate)
- Rostroraja equatorialis (D. S. Jordan & Bollman, 1890) (equatorial ray)
- Rostroraja texana (A. C. Chandler, 1921) (Roundel skate)
- Rostroraja velezi (Chirichigno F., 1973) (Velez ray)
