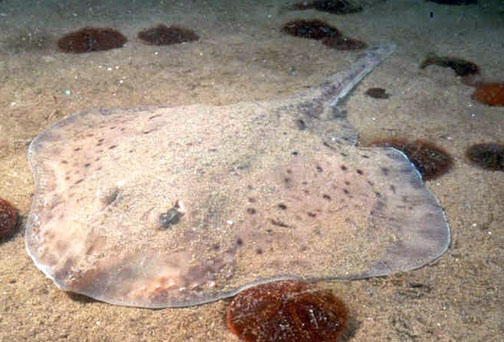
- Leucoraja erinacea

Scientific classification
- Kingdom: Animalia
- Phylum: Chordata
- Class: Chondrichthyes
- Subclass: Elasmobranchii
- Order: Rajiformes
- Family: Rajidae
- Genus: Leucoraja; Malm, 1877

Type species
- Raja fullonica Linnaeus, 1758

Species
- See text

= Leucoraja =

Genus of cartilaginous fishes

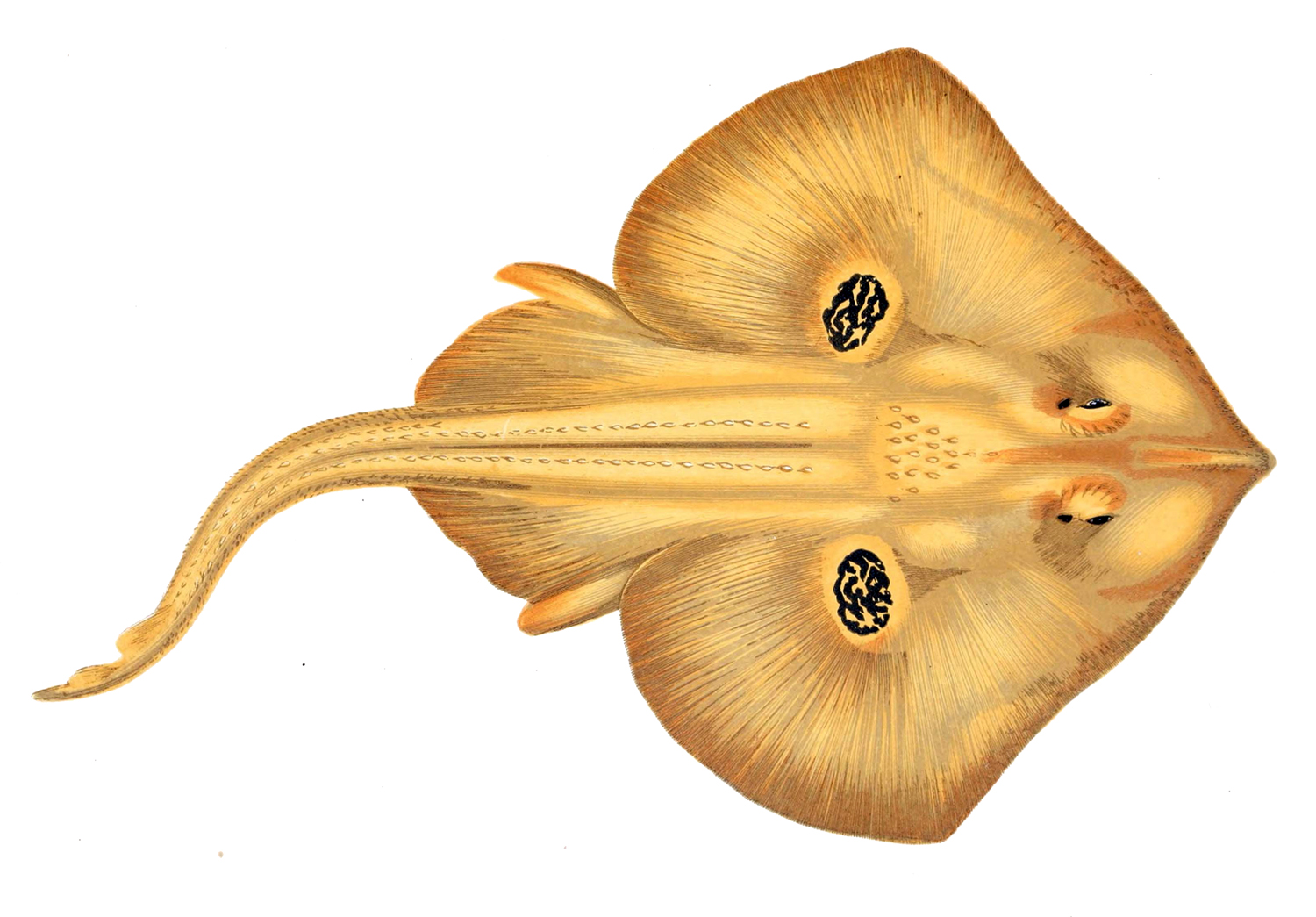
Cuckoo ray, Leucoraja naevus

Leucoraja is a genus of hardnose skates in the family Rajidae, commonly known as the rough skates. They occur mostly on continental shelves and slopes in the north-western and eastern Atlantic Ocean, the Mediterranean Sea, the south-western Indian Ocean, and Australia.

== Species ==
There are currently 15 species in this genus:

- Leucoraja circularis (Couch, 1838) (sandy ray)
- Leucoraja compagnoi (Stehmann, 1995) (tigertail skate)
- Leucoraja elaineae (Ebert & Leslie, 2019)
- Leucoraja erinaceus (Mitchill, 1825) (little skate)
- Leucoraja fullonica (Linnaeus, 1758) (shagreen skate)
- Leucoraja garmani (Whitley, 1939) (rosette skate)
- Leucoraja lentiginosa (Bigelow & Schroeder, 1951) (freckled skate)
- Leucoraja leucosticta (Stehmann, 1971) (whitedappled skate)
- Leucoraja longirostris Weigmann, Stehmann, Séret & Ishihara, 2024 (brown longnose skate)
- Leucoraja melitensis (R. S. Clark, 1926) (Maltese skate)
- Leucoraja naevus (J. P. Müller & Henle, 1841) (cuckoo skate)
- Leucoraja ocellata (Mitchill, 1815) (winter skate)
- Leucoraja pristispina Last, Stehmann & Séret, 2008 (sawback skate)
- Leucoraja wallacei (Hulley, 1970) (yellow-spotted skate)
- Leucoraja yucatanensis ([Bigelow & Schroeder, 1950) (Yucatán skate)

Synonyms

- Leucoraja caribbaea (McEachran, 1977) (Maya skate); valid as L. garmani
- Leucoraja virginica (McEachran, 1977) (Virginia skate); valid as L. garmani
