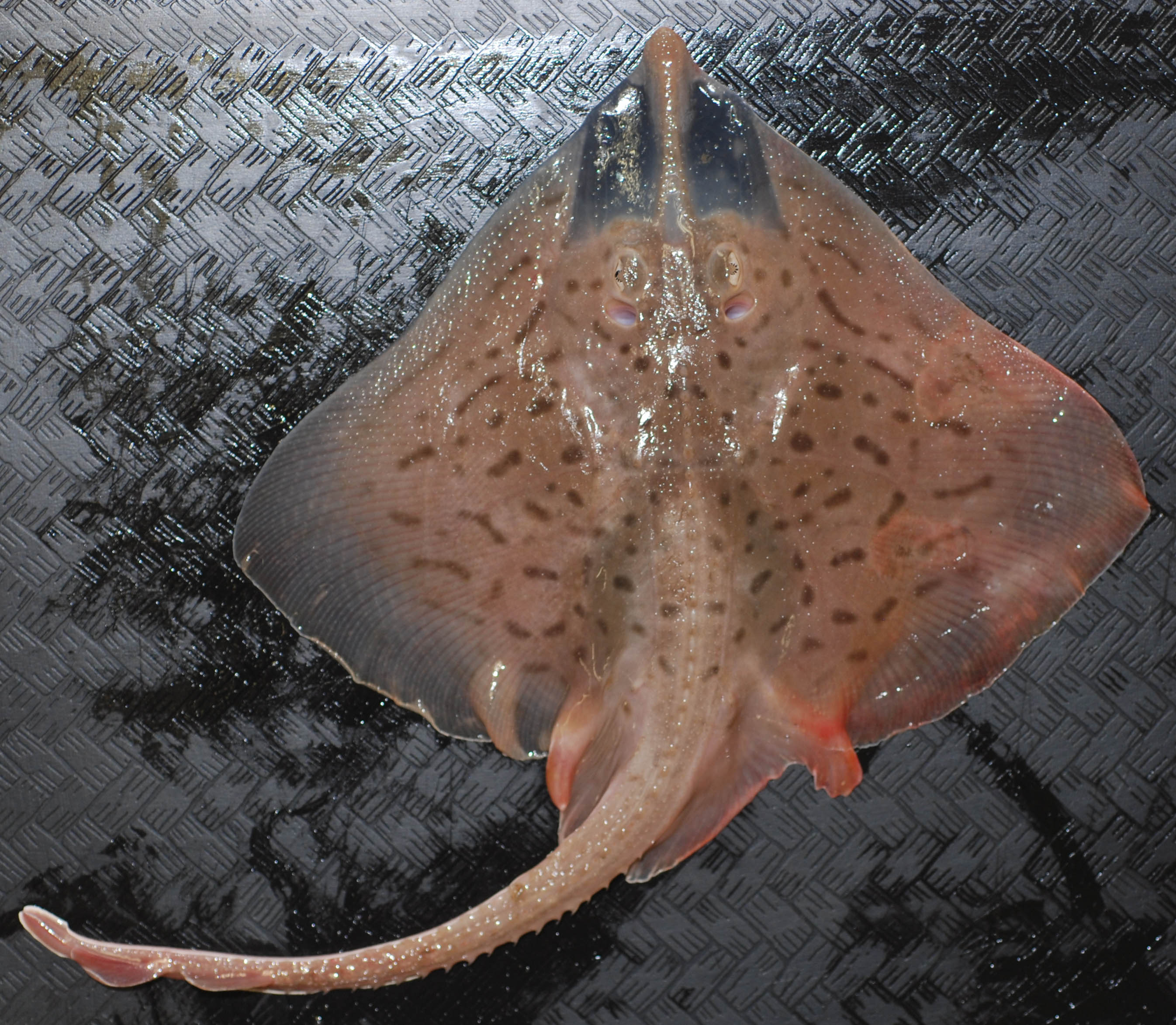

Conservation status
- Least Concern (IUCN 3.1)

Scientific classification
- Kingdom: Animalia
- Phylum: Chordata
- Class: Chondrichthyes
- Subclass: Elasmobranchii
- Order: Rajiformes
- Family: Rajidae
- Genus: Rostroraja
- Species: R. eglanteria

Binomial name
- Rostroraja eglanteria L. A. G. Bosc, 1800

Synonyms
- Raia chantenay Lesueur, 1824; Raia desmarestia Lesueur, 1824; Raja diaphanes Mitchill, 1815; Raja eglanteria Bosc, 1800

= Clearnose skate =

Species of cartilaginous fish

The clearnose skate (Rostroraja eglanteria) is a species of cartilaginous fish in the family Rajidae. R. eglanteria is also known by other common names such as the brier skate and summer skate. Clearnose skates are easily identified by the translucent patches on either side of their snouts and their mottled dorsal surface. They are found along the Atlantic and Gulf coasts of the United States in shallow waters of the continental shelf.

== Taxonomy ==
Clearnose skates are elasmobranchs in the order Rajiformes and family Rajidae. They were one of nearly thirty members of the genus Raja before redesignation based on DNA analysis in 2016. Clearnose skates were first described as Raja eglanteria by Bosc in 1800. Other scientific names include R. chantenay, R. desmarestia, and R. diaphanes; however, these names rarely appear in the literature.

== Description ==
Clearnose skates are named for the characteristic light-colored to translucent patches along both sides of the rostrum. The dorsal surface is primarily brown to grey in color, while the ventral surface is white. The dorsal side of the pectoral fins also exhibits dark brown to black bars and spots.

R. eglanteria has a roughly rhombic disc shape, with the snout and pectoral fins making an approximate right angle. Mature clearnose skates reach up to 79 cm (31 in) in total length and 52 cm (20 in) in width. The tail is approximately half the total length.

Another notable characteristic of clearnose skates is their line of thorns along the middle of the back and tail. The remainder of the dorsal surface is covered in small prickles, yielding the common name of brier skate. These prickles are concentrated on the anterior portion of the disc, as well as along the spine, like the thorns.

== Habitat and distribution ==
The range of R. eglanteria includes the eastern coast of the United States, with its northernmost range in Massachusetts and southernmost in Florida. The clearnose skate's range then extends around the Florida peninsula to the eastern and north portions of the Gulf of Mexico.

Like other skate species, clearnose skates are demersal. They can be found on soft substrates like mud and sand, or on harder surfaces like rock and gravel.

Clearnose skates prefer shallow water that is at least partially saline (≥22 ppt). These skates are most commonly found at depths less than 111 m, but can be in waters as deep as 330 m. Clearnose Skate depth and distance from shore is dependent on season and latitude. In general, in the Mid-Atlantic Bight these skates are closer to shore in the spring, summer, and fall.

R. eglanteria can be found in water anywhere from 41 to 86 °F (5 to 30 °C). Preferred temperature ranges are dependent on latitude, with skates in the northern regions of their range tolerating a larger temperature range than their southern counterparts.

== Biology ==
=== Feeding ===
The diet of clearnose skates includes crustaceans and molluscs, such as shrimp and fiddler crabs, as well as small fish. Hunting occurs primarily at night, with the skates searching along the seafloor for food.

Clearnose skates have 46 to 54 teeth in their upper jaw and approximately the same number in their lower jaw. These teeth are blunt, small, and close together, enabling the skate to crush the hard shells of its prey. Male clearnose skates have sharper teeth than females, although this is probably to aid in copulation rather than feeding.

=== Behavior ===
Like other batoids, clearnose skates exhibit walking, or "punting", along the benthic substrate using their modified pelvic fins. To propel itself forward via punting, a skate first anchors its pelvic fin into the seafloor and then pushes the fin toward its tail. During this action, the rest of the body of the skate remains motionless. Another form of swimming locomotion in R. elganteria is through the undulation of the pectoral fins.

Orientation and position of the skate, whether during swimming, punting, or hunting, is determined using neuromasts, which are a primary component of the lateral line.

=== Reproduction ===
==== Copulation ====
The courtship ritual of clearnose skates was observed and well-documented by Luer and Gilbert:

Typically the male grasps the trailing edge of the female's pectoral fin in his jaws when both are resting on their ventral surface in the pool or tank. Following this action, he swings his tail beneath her pelvic fin and tail, flexes one clasper medially and inserts it into her cloacal aperture. Prior to and during insertions, the clasper is lubricated from secretions of the clasper gland. The process of insertion is slow and methodical during which time the male repeatedly thrusts his clasper slowly forward up into the female's genital tract. Sometimes it takes an hour or more before the clasper is fully inserted.

==== Eggs ====
Clearnose skates are oviparous, and therefore they lay fertilized eggs, commonly referred to as Mermaid's purses. Each corner of the rectangular egg case has a small curved horn. The size of the egg case ranges from 6.4 to 7.7 cm (2.5 to 3.0 in) long and 3.7 to 4.7 cm (1.5 to 1.9 in) wide.

Egg deposition occurs in pairs, and up to 30 pairs may be laid by a female. As the female lays the egg, the longer anterior horns emerge first. The shorter posterior horns follow and enable the egg case to anchor to the substrate, as they are covered in a sticky substance.

At first, the embryo is completely enclosed within the egg case. As it develops, a small hole (called the respiratory canal) along the base of the horns opens, allowing seawater to enter the case. The flow of seawater is maintained by the tail beating of the embryo.

Embryonic clearnose skates demonstrate a ventilatory freeze response when a weak low-frequency electric field is imposed upon the egg capsule. This freeze behavior will cause the egg-encapsulated embryonic skates to stop ventilatory streaming. This will decrease the likelihood of sensory detection, and thus "cloak" embryos from searching egg predators.

=== Life cycle ===
The clearnose skate life cycle starts when a female deposits an egg. The embryo begins to enlarge as its cells divide. As division occurs, regionalization of the skate can be observed, with head and tail regions. Development continues with the formation of neural components, as well as spiracles and gill filaments. Other structures and organs continue to differentiate and grow, and finally the mottled pattern of the dorsal surface is developed.

The embryos incubate within the egg case for approximately 12 weeks. Eventually, the embryo grows too large for the egg case, and will then break free by extending its pectoral fins and tail. Hatchlings are approximately 13 to 15 cm (5.1 to 5.9 in) in total length and 8.4 to 10.5 cm (3.3 to 4.1 in) in disc width.

Age of maturity ranges between two and six years, depending on sex, with females taking longer to mature than males. The size of mature male skates is a minimum of 56 cm (22 in), and of females 59 cm (23 in).

== Human interaction ==
Clearnose skates are not commonly targeted in commercial fishing due to their small size; however, these skates are captured as bycatch, especially in trawling.
