= Maya skate =

Scientific classification
- Kingdom: Animalia
- Phylum: Chordata
- Class: Chondrichthyes
- Subclass: Elasmobranchii
- Order: Rajiformes
- Family: Rajidae
- Genus: Leucoraja
- Species: L. caribbaea

Binomial name
- Leucoraja caribbaea (McEachran, 1977)

Species of cartilaginous fish

The Maya skate (Leucoraja caribbaea) is a species of skate in the family Rajidae. It is found in the western Atlantic Ocean off the coast of Mexico at a depths near 457 metres.
