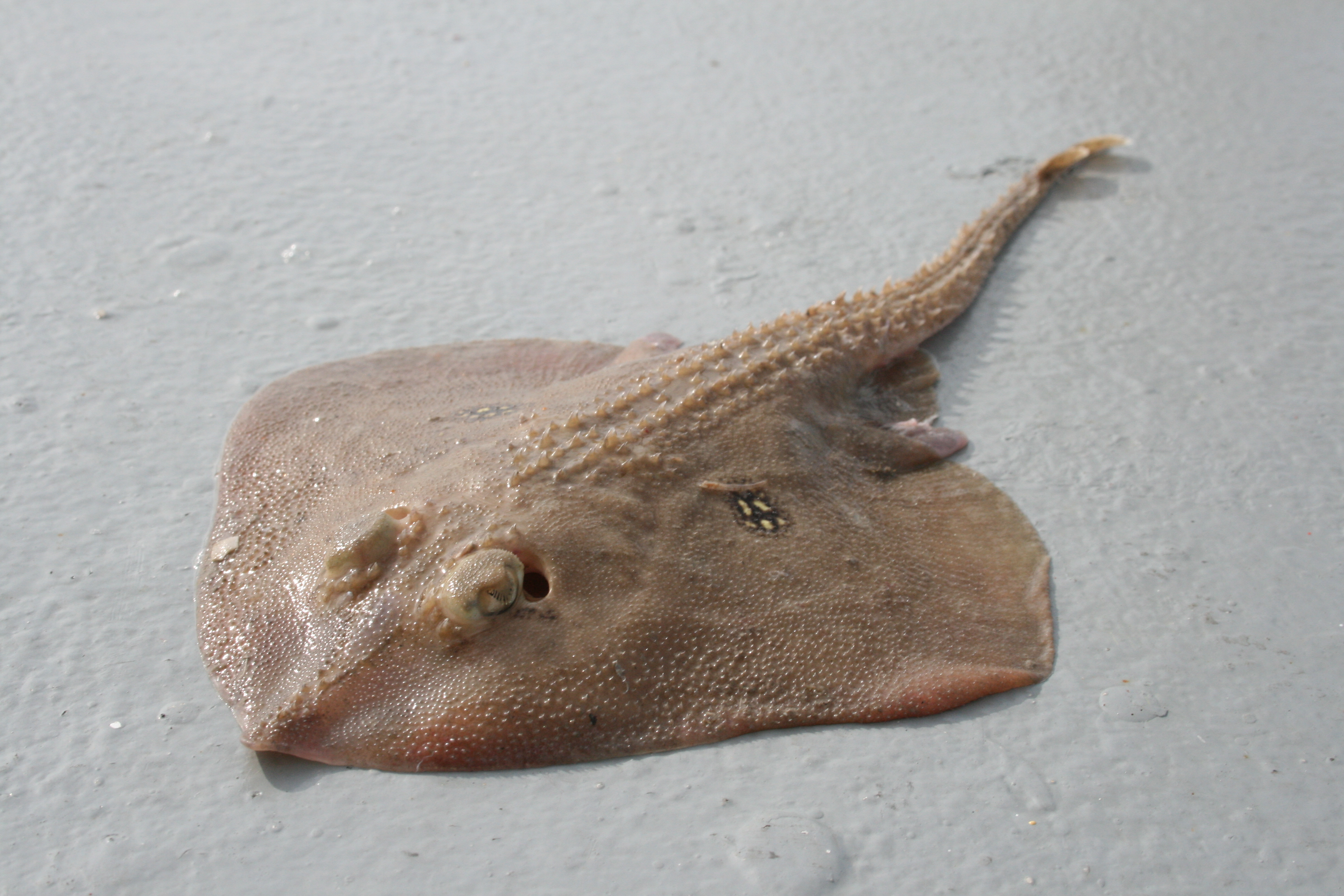

Conservation status
- Near Threatened (IUCN 3.1)

Scientific classification
- Kingdom: Animalia
- Phylum: Chordata
- Class: Chondrichthyes
- Subclass: Elasmobranchii
- Order: Rajiformes
- Family: Rajidae
- Genus: Leucoraja
- Species: L. naevus

Binomial name
- Leucoraja naevus (Müller & Henle, 1841)

= Leucoraja naevus =

Species of fish

Leucoraja naevus, commonly known as the cuckoo skate or the cuckoo ray, is a species of fish belonging to the family Rajidae.

== Description ==
Close-up of the tail of a female showing alar thorns

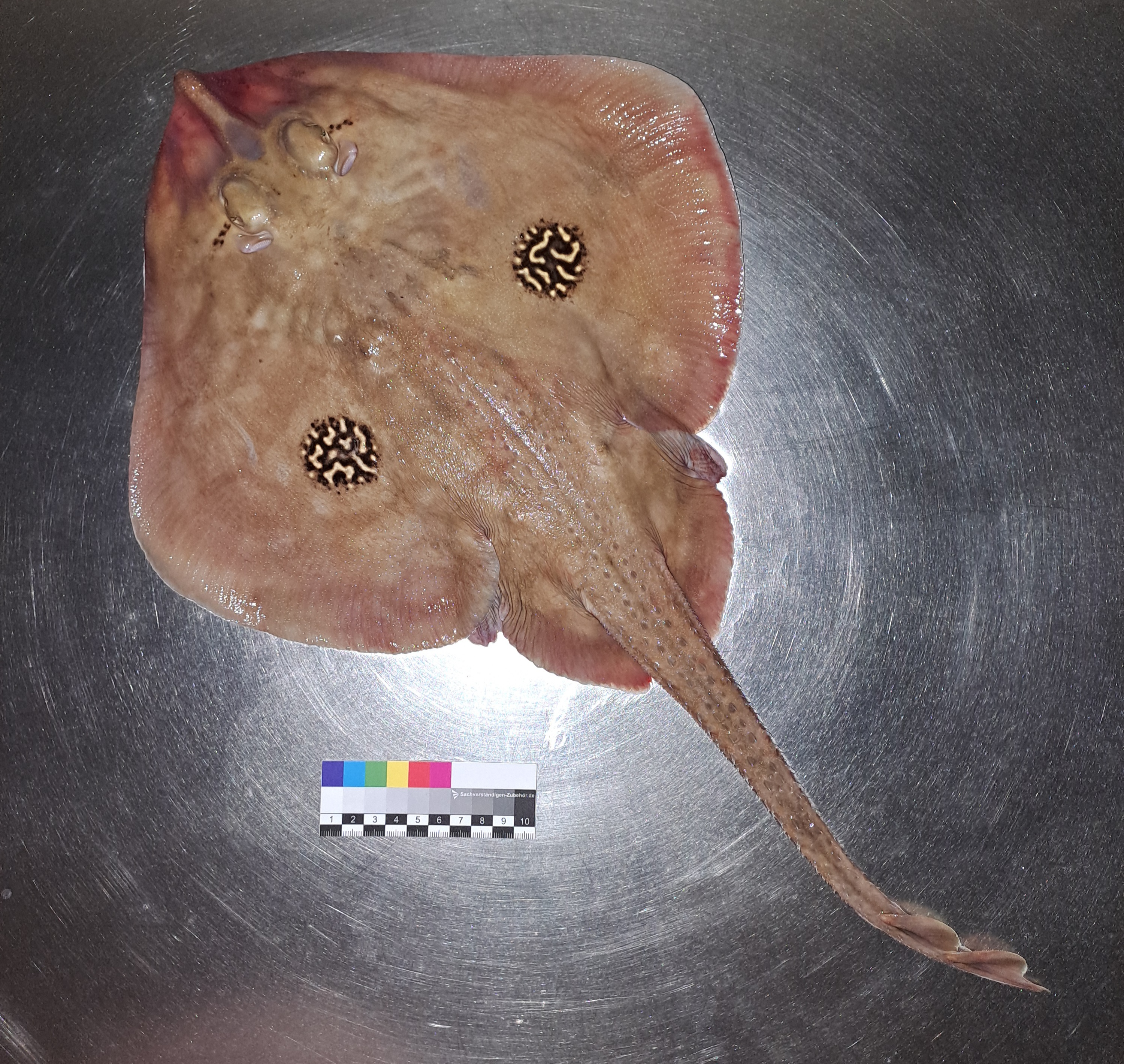
Seen from above, the circular ocelli are prominent

The cuckoo skate has a maximum total length of 81 centimetres (32 in), and they reach maturity at a total length of 50–57 centimetres (20–22 in) for males and 53–60 centimetres (21–24 in) for females. Their snout is short and bluntly angled, and it features a tip which is slightly pronounced. The tail of the cuckoo skate is longer than the length of their disc, and it tapers towards its tip. It has 9-13 orbital thorns and no interdorsal thorns. Males have both alar and malar thorns.

It has circular ocelli with a blackish background. The upper and lower jaws of the cuckoo skate have 50-60 rows. The dorsal surface is light grey to brown in colouration, while the ventral surface is white and has greyish margins for the disc and pelvic fin lobe.

== Distribution and habitat ==
The cuckoo skate is mainly found along the coasts of the Northern Atlantic Ocean and occasionally in the Mediterranean Sea. It occurs between 10–900 metres (33–2,953 ft), but is most commonly found at depths of 50–200 metres (160–660 ft). It lives over seabeds of sand, rock, and cobble substrates.

== Biology ==
L. naevus is oviparous, with females able to deposit as many as 100 egg cases each year. The egg cases measure 5–7 centimetres (2.0–2.8 in) long and 3–5 centimetres (1.2–2.0 in) in width. Maturity is reached at 7.4 years for females and 6.8 years for males. The diet of the cuckoo skate changes as it grows, with juveniles eating crustaceans and polychaetas while adults eat bony fishes.
