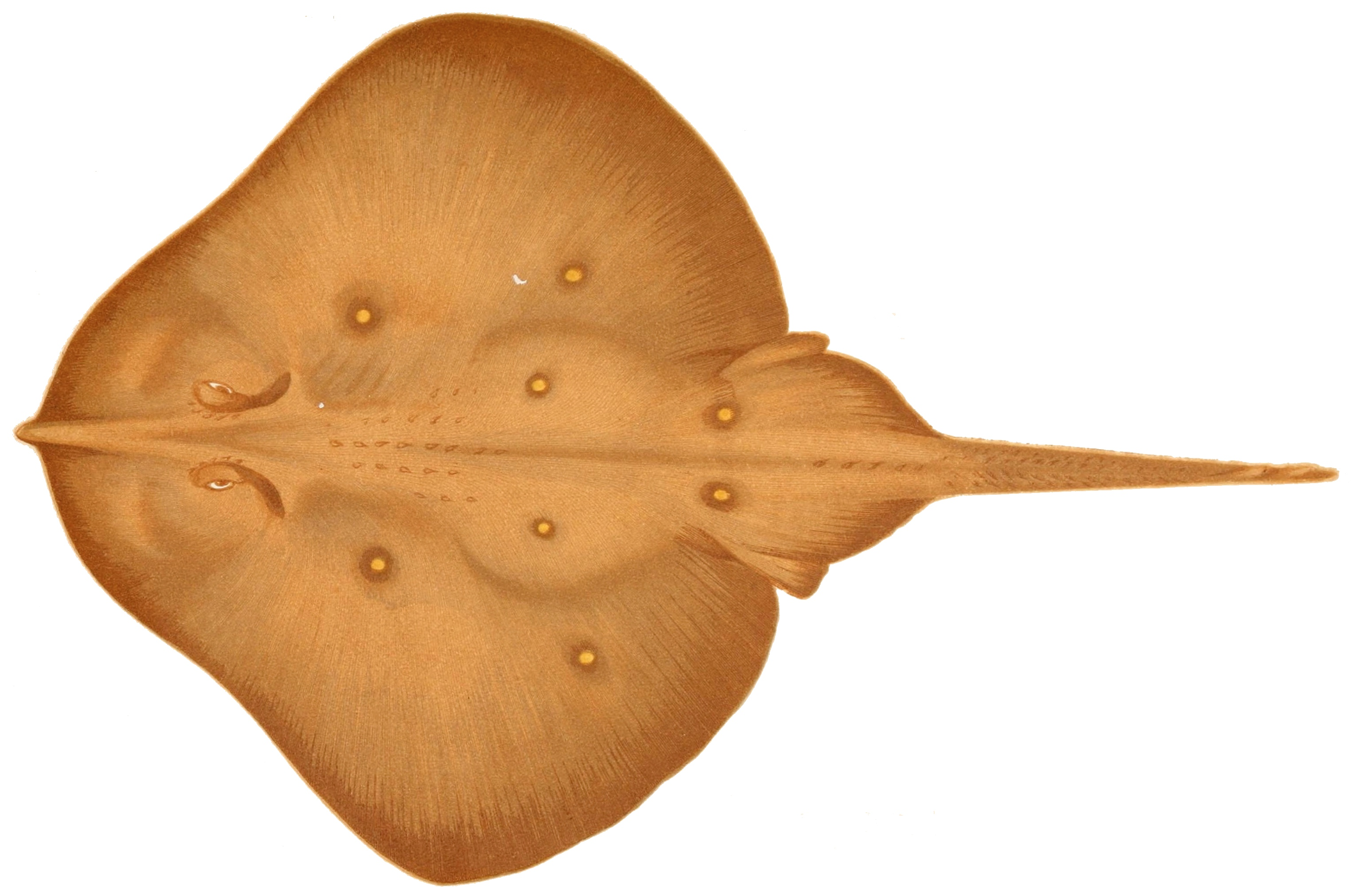
- Illustration of dorsal surface, Jonathan Couch

Conservation status
- Endangered (IUCN 3.1)

Scientific classification
- Kingdom: Animalia
- Phylum: Chordata
- Class: Chondrichthyes
- Subclass: Elasmobranchii
- Order: Rajiformes
- Family: Rajidae
- Genus: Leucoraja
- Species: L. circularis

Binomial name
- Leucoraja circularis (Couch, 1838)

Synonyms
- Raia circularis Raja circularis Raja falsavela Raja falsavela intermedia Raja falsavela maggiore Raja (Leucoraja) circularis

= Sandy ray =

Species of cartilaginous fish

The sandy ray (Leucoraja circularis) or sandy skate is a species of ray in the family Rajidae.

== Description ==
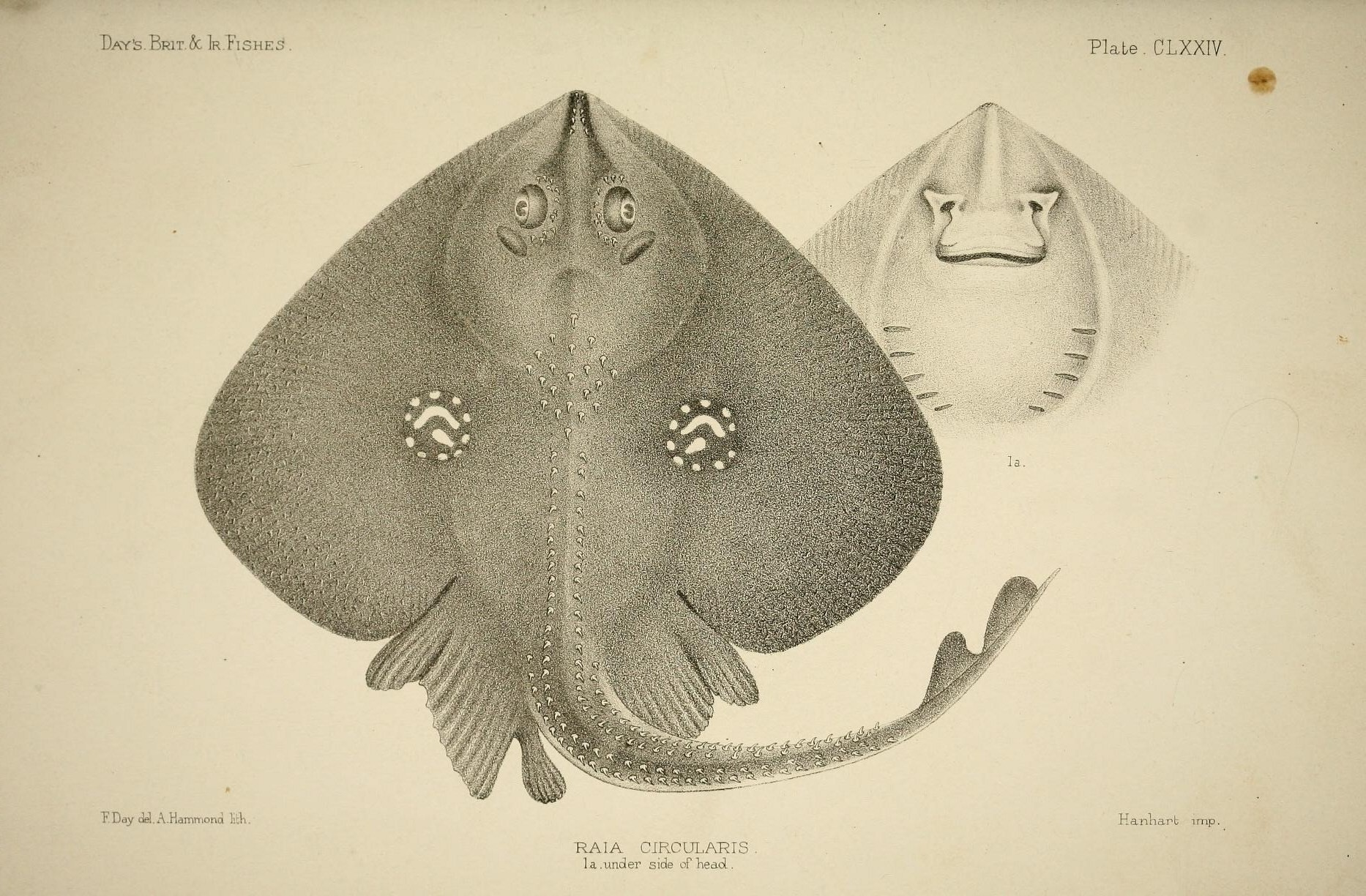
Diagram from The fishes of Great Britain and Ireland (1884)

It maximum length is 1.2 m (3 ft 11 in), typical adults measuring 70 cm (2.3 ft). It has a short snout with a spinulose reddish-brown dorsal surface, a tail only slightly longer than body, and a white underside. A distinctive feature is the 4–6 creamy-coloured spots on each wing. Its ventral surface is white in colour with pale grey margins, and the area around its snout is rough in texture. There are 8 orbital thorns around the eyes of the sandy skate, and adult males have both alar and malar thorns. Its upper and lower jaws have between 64-84 rows of teeth.

== Habitat ==
The sandy ray lives in the demersal zone of the offshore waters of Western Europe and the Mediterranean Sea, at depths between 70 m (230 ft) and 676 m (2,218 ft). It lives on seabeds with substrates of sand and mud. According to the FAO this species should be considered extinct in Mediterranean Sea, but recent records contradict this view.

== Behaviour ==
The sandy ray is oviparous and lays its egg cases between August and November. The egg cases measure 8–9 centimetres (3.1–3.5 in) long and 5–5.5 centimetres (2.0–2.2 in) wide. It feeds on benthic invertebrates and small bony fish.
