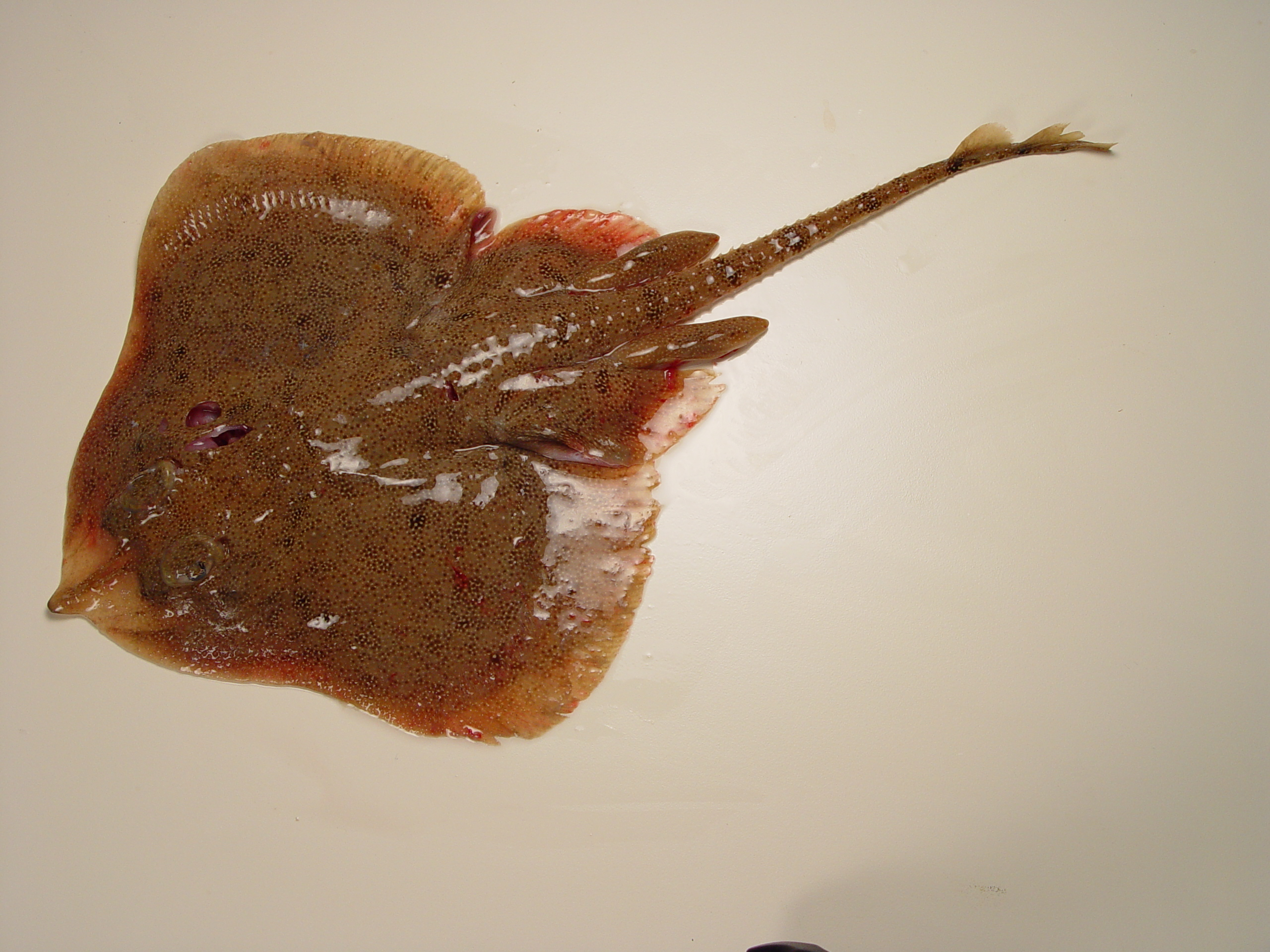

Conservation status
- Least Concern (IUCN 3.1)

Scientific classification
- Kingdom: Animalia
- Phylum: Chordata
- Class: Chondrichthyes
- Subclass: Elasmobranchii
- Order: Rajiformes
- Family: Rajidae
- Genus: Leucoraja
- Species: L. garmani

Binomial name
- Leucoraja garmani (Whitley, 1939)

Synonyms
- Raja ackleyi ornata Garman, 1881 (preoccupied)

= Rosette skate =

Species of cartilaginous fish

The rosette skate (Leucoraja garmani) is an abundant mid-depth skate.

== Etymology ==
The skate is named in honor of American ichthyologist-herpetologist Samuel Garman (1843‒1927), of Harvard University.

== Description ==
The rosette skate is a relatively small species of skate, growing up to about 44 cm long. It has a disc-heart or spade shape with a rounded snout. The dorsal fins are separate and have one or two intervening thorns. Along the skate's tail are 33 to 35 thorns. The dorsal side of the rosette skate is brown and freckled, with dark and light spots that form dark rosettes surrounding a dark central spot. This pattern is where the skate gets its common name from. The ventral side of the rosette skate is light-colored, either white or yellowish.

== Distribution and habitat ==
The rosette skate is typically found at depths between 33 and 530 meters (110 and 1,740 ft) and at temperatures 9 to 13°C, though it can live at 5.3 to 17°C. At the extremes on the United States' Atlantic Coast, specimens have been found as far north as the Nantucket Shoals and as far south as the Dry Tortugas. Beyond, it has been located throughout the Caribbean, the eastern shores of Mexico and Central American, and the northern shores of South America.

== Relationship to humans ==
Based on reported bycatch rates and population observances, there is no evidence to support concern of the rosette skate.
