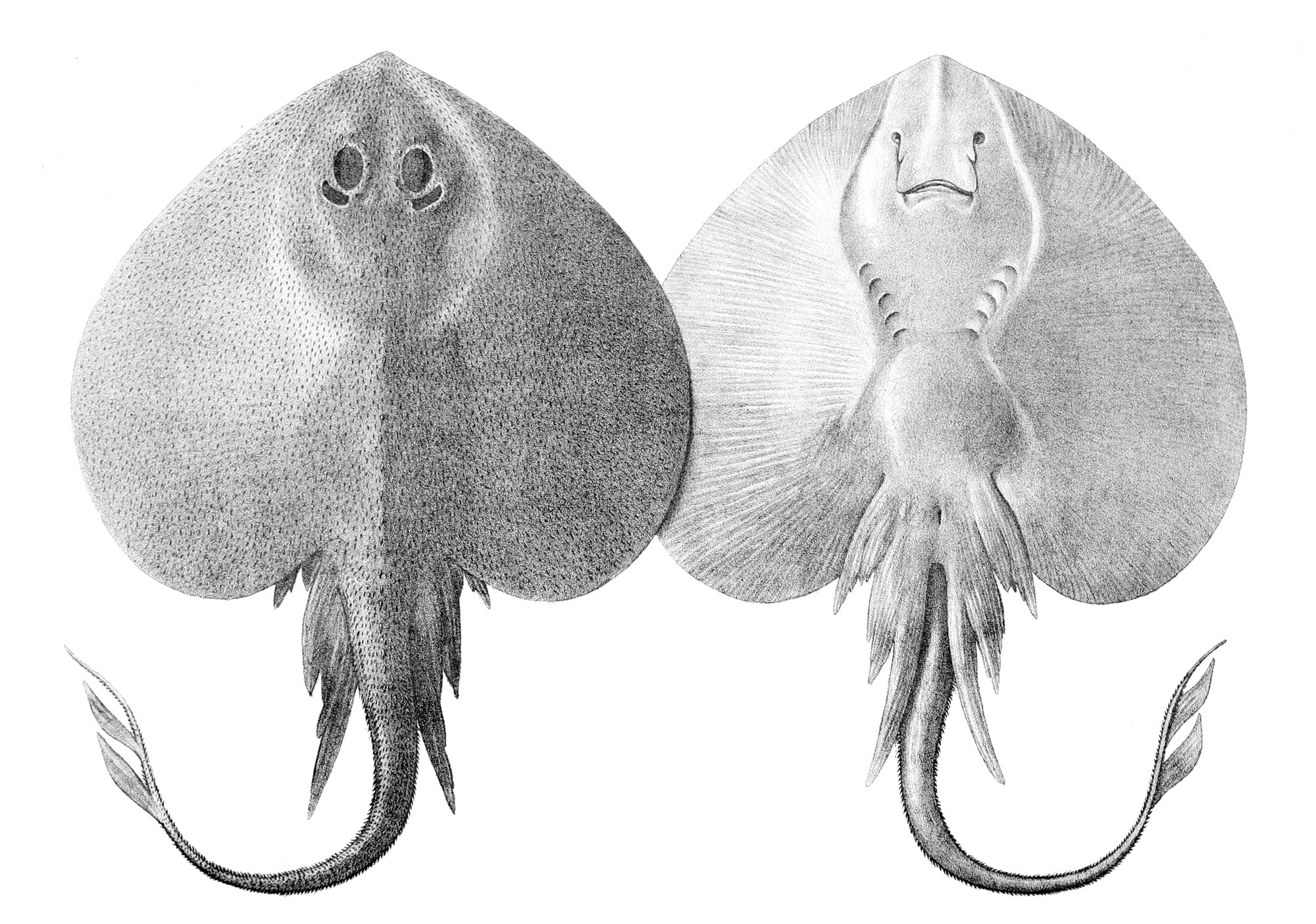

Conservation status
- Vulnerable (IUCN 3.1)

Scientific classification
- Kingdom: Animalia
- Phylum: Chordata
- Class: Chondrichthyes
- Subclass: Elasmobranchii
- Order: Rajiformes
- Family: Rajidae
- Genus: Leucoraja
- Species: L. fullonica

Binomial name
- Leucoraja fullonica (Linnaeus, 1758)

Synonyms
- Raja chagrinea Shaw, 1804; Raja fullonica Linnaeus, 1758

= Shagreen ray =

Species of cartilaginous fish

The shagreen ray (Leucoraja fullonica), also known as shagreen skate or fuller's ray, is a species of skate in the family Rajidae. This ray is found in the eastern Atlantic Ocean, from Murmansk, Russia through Norway, southern Iceland, the Faroe Islands, the Celtic Sea, the northern North Sea and Skagerrak, to western Morocco and the Madeira archipelago, but not in the shallow waters off England and Wales. It is also recorded sporadically in the Mediterranean Sea.

Shagreen is a form of roughened untanned leather, typically dyed green and commonly made of the skins of sharks and rays. The common name "fuller's ray" comes from an instrument used by fullers to smooth cloth, referring to its rough and spiny back.

== Description ==
The pectoral fin disc of the shagreen ray is somewhat wider than it is long. The forward margin concave and undulated, and about one-third longer than the rear margin. The snout is cone-shaped and pointed. The tail is shorter than the disc, with two small, equally sized dorsal fins and a rudimentary caudal fin. The eyes and mouth are large; the teeth are pointed and number about 64 in the upper jaw and 56 in the lower. The upper surface is rough in texture, with patches of large spines on the snout, around the eyes, and on the shoulder. The shagreen skate has between 3-9 nuchal thorns, as well as 8 orbital thorns. There are two rows of about 50 spines each running from the center of the back to the first dorsal fin, and no interdorsal spine. The underside is smooth except for the front edge of the disc, base of the tail, and tail. The coloration is a uniform gray or brown with smaller darker dots above, and white below. The maximum size is to 120 cm long.

== Distribution and habitat ==
This species occurs in relatively cold water on the upper continental slopes at a depth of 30–550 m. It is most common at depths of 200 m, but is found deeper in southern areas. It favors sandy, muddy, and possibly also rocky seabed habitats.

== Biology ==
The shagreen ray feeds on a variety of benthic animals, mainly fishes but also crustaceans. Like other skates reproduction is oviparous; the egg capsules are amber in color and oblong-shaped, with long, stiff horns at each corner. Egg cases are laid from August to November. One pair of horns are longer than the capsule. The capsules measure 7.5-9.9 cm long and 4.5-4.7 cm wide. Historically this ray was considered of "inferior" quality for consumption. It is caught commercially by longlines and trawls.
