= Sukhoe =

Korean blanched seafood, vegetables, or offals

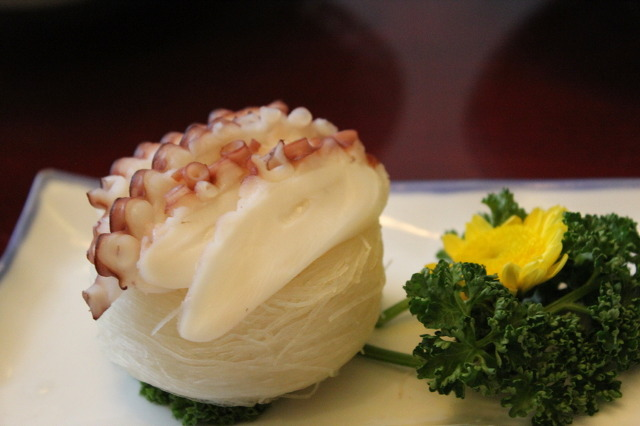
- Muneo-sukhoe (blanched octopus)
- Type: Hoe
- Place of origin: Korea
- Associated cuisine: Korean cuisine

Korean name
- Hangul: 숙회
- Hanja: 熟鱠
- RR: sukhoe
- MR: sukhoe
- IPA: [su.kʰwe̞]

Sukhoe (Korean: 숙회) is a variety of hoe dishes consisting of blanched vegetables, seafoods, or offals. Sukhoe is usually dipped in chojang, the mixture made of gochujang and vinegar.

== History ==
A number of sukhoe varieties are listed in a 17th-century cookbook, Jubangmun.

== Varieties ==
- Cheonggak-hoe (청각회) – Blanched green sea fingers are chopped finely, and served with chojang (dipping sauce made with gochujang and vinegar).
- Dureup-hoe (두릅회) – Blanched dureup (angelica-tree shoots) are served with chojang.
- Eochae (어채) or saengseon-sukhoe (생선숙회) – Fresh fish, boiled beef lung, sea cucumber, abalone are sliced, mixed with silpa (thread scallions), Indian chrysanthemum leaves, pyogo and seogi mushrooms, and coated with starch slurry, blanched, and served in sesame milk.
- Gaji-hoe (가지회) – Aubergines are blanched in salt water, sliced thinly, and served with mustard sauce.
- Minari-hoe (미나리회) – Blanched or raw minari (Oenanthe javanica) is served with chojang.
- Muneo-sukhoe (문어숙회) – Fresh giant octopus is skinned, blanched, and served with chojang.
- Sunchae-hoe (순채회) – Young leaves of brasenia is blanched, soaked in cold water, strained, and served with chojang.

== Gallery ==
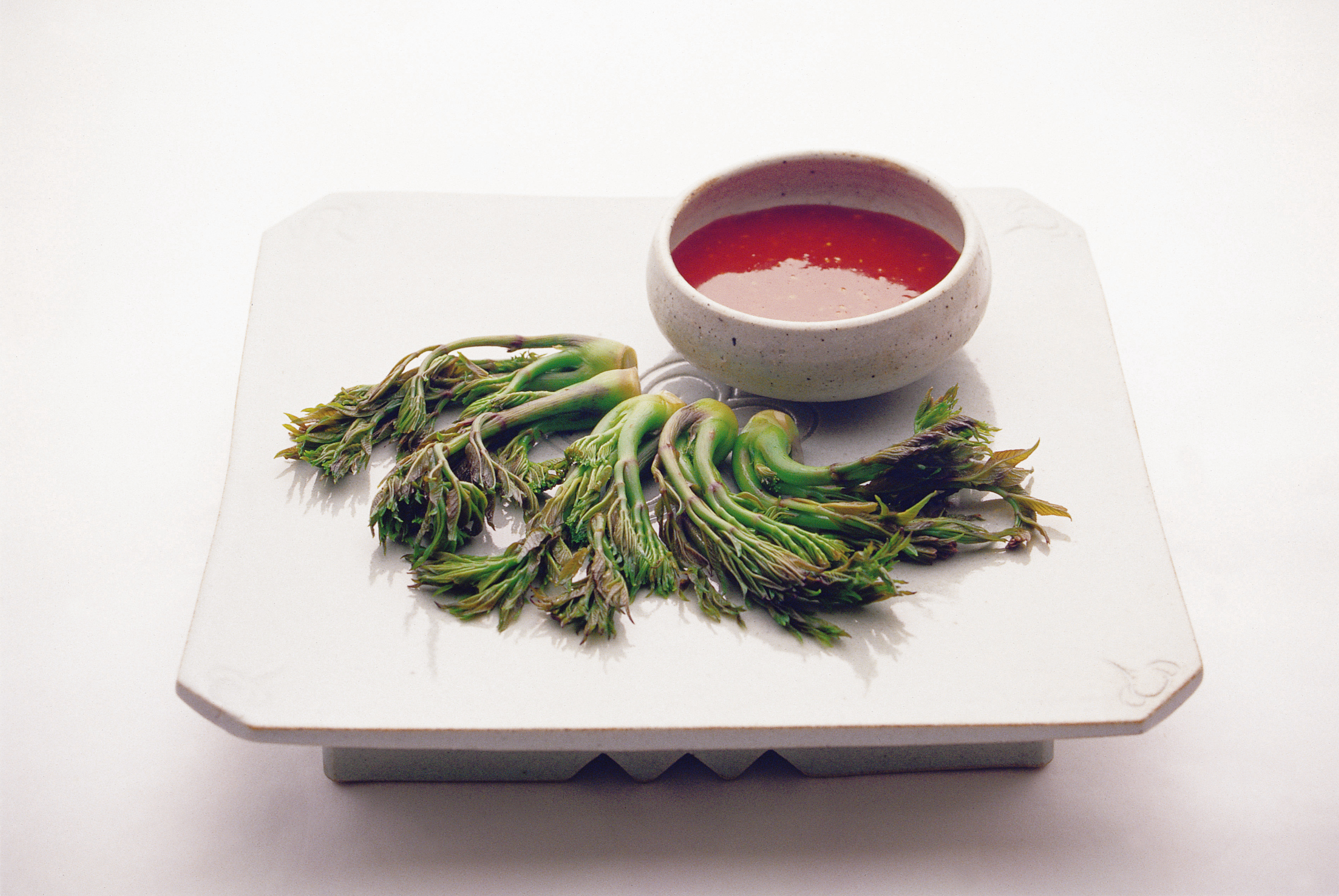
Dureup-hoe (blanched angelica-tree shoots) served with chojang

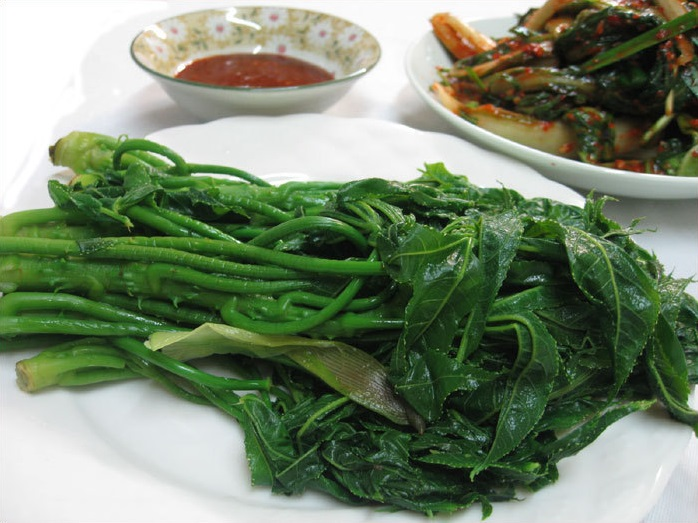
Eumnamu-sun-hoe (blanched castor aralia shoots)

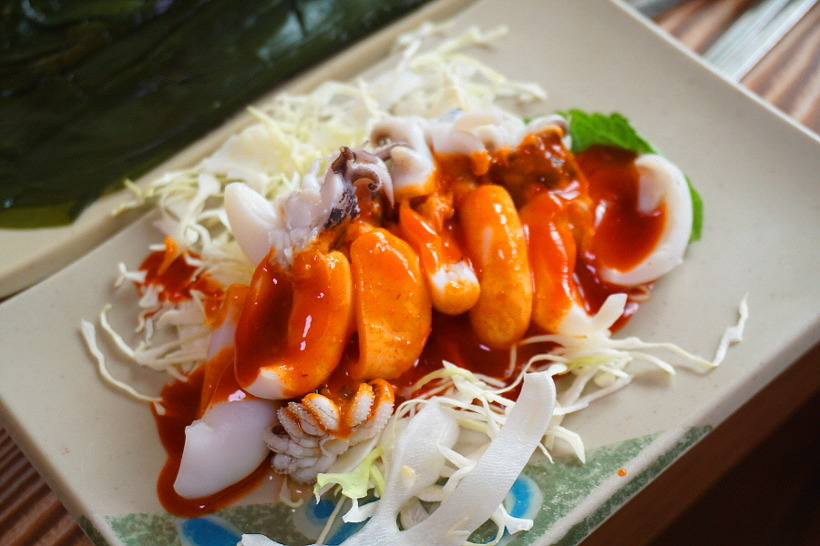
Hanchi-sukhoe (blanched mitre squid)

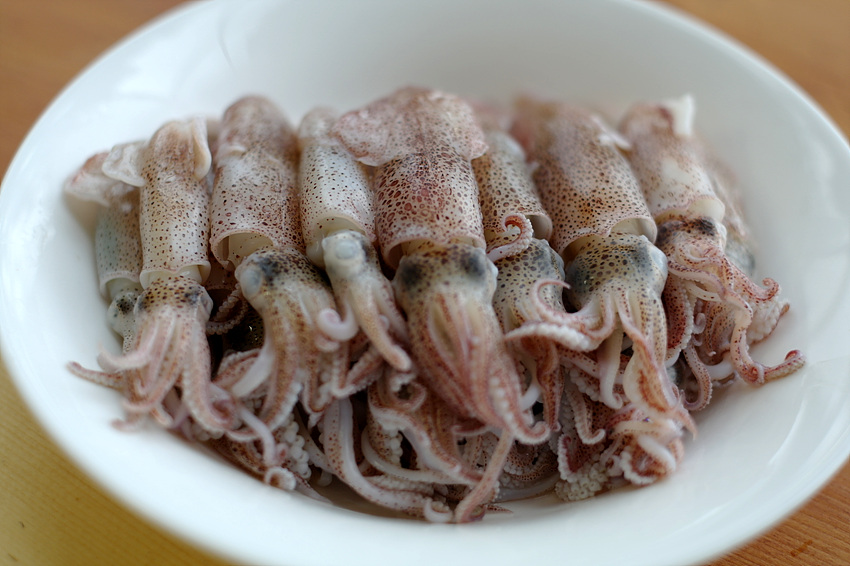
Horaegi-sukhoe (blanched loliolus squid)

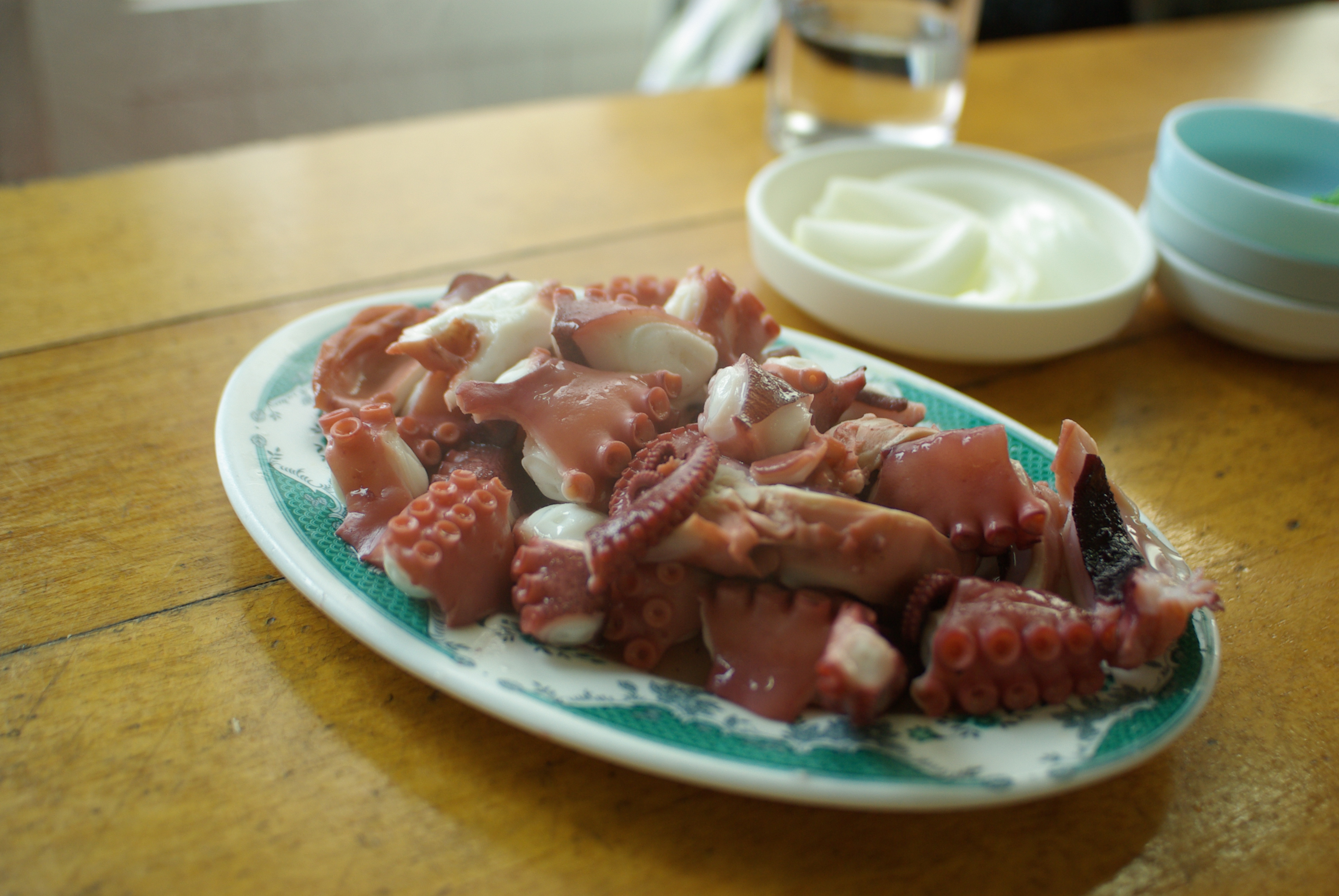
Muneo-sukhoe (blanched giant octopus)

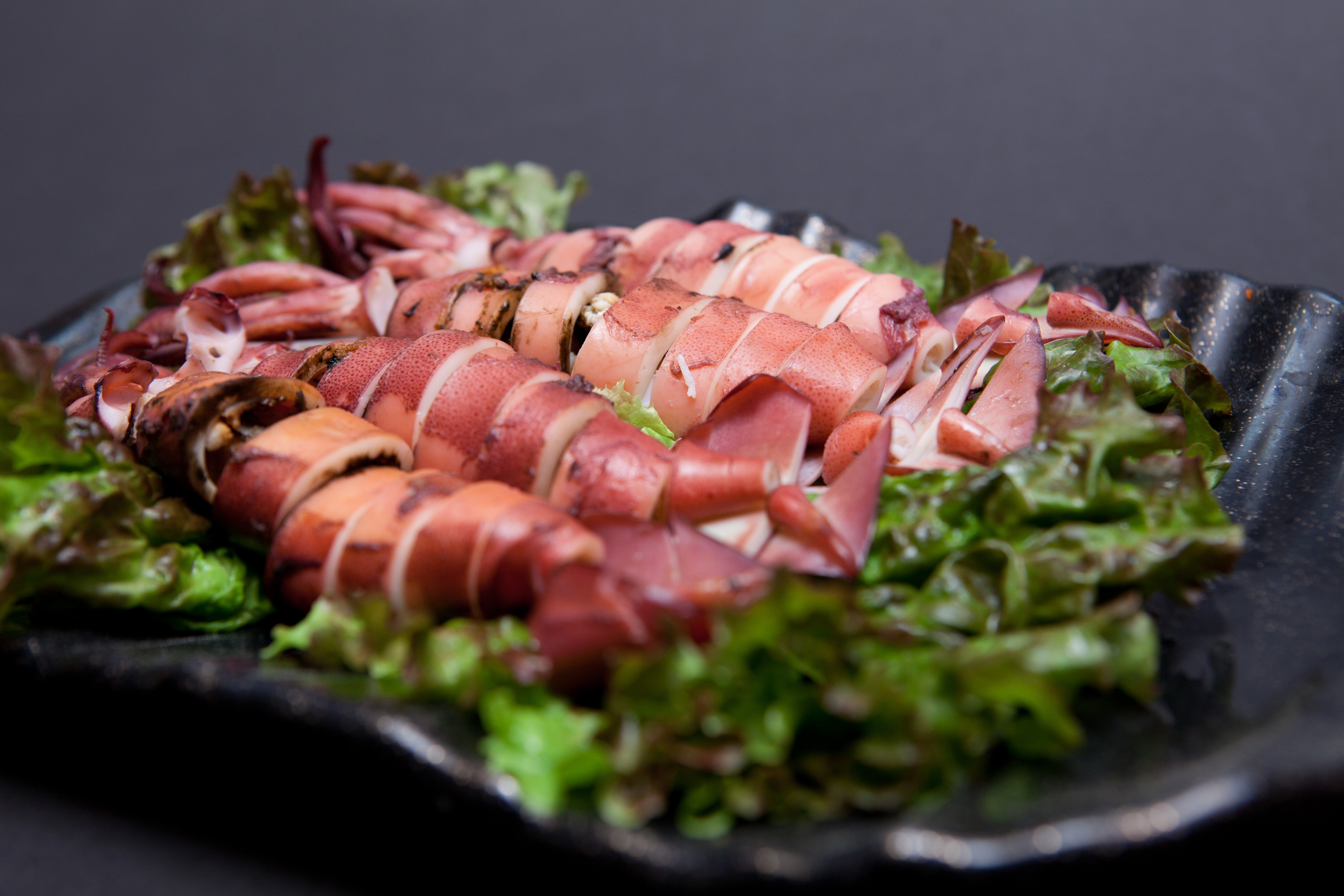
Ojingeo-sukhoe (blanched flying squid)

== See also ==
- Ganghoe
