= Hoe (food) =

Korean raw food dishes

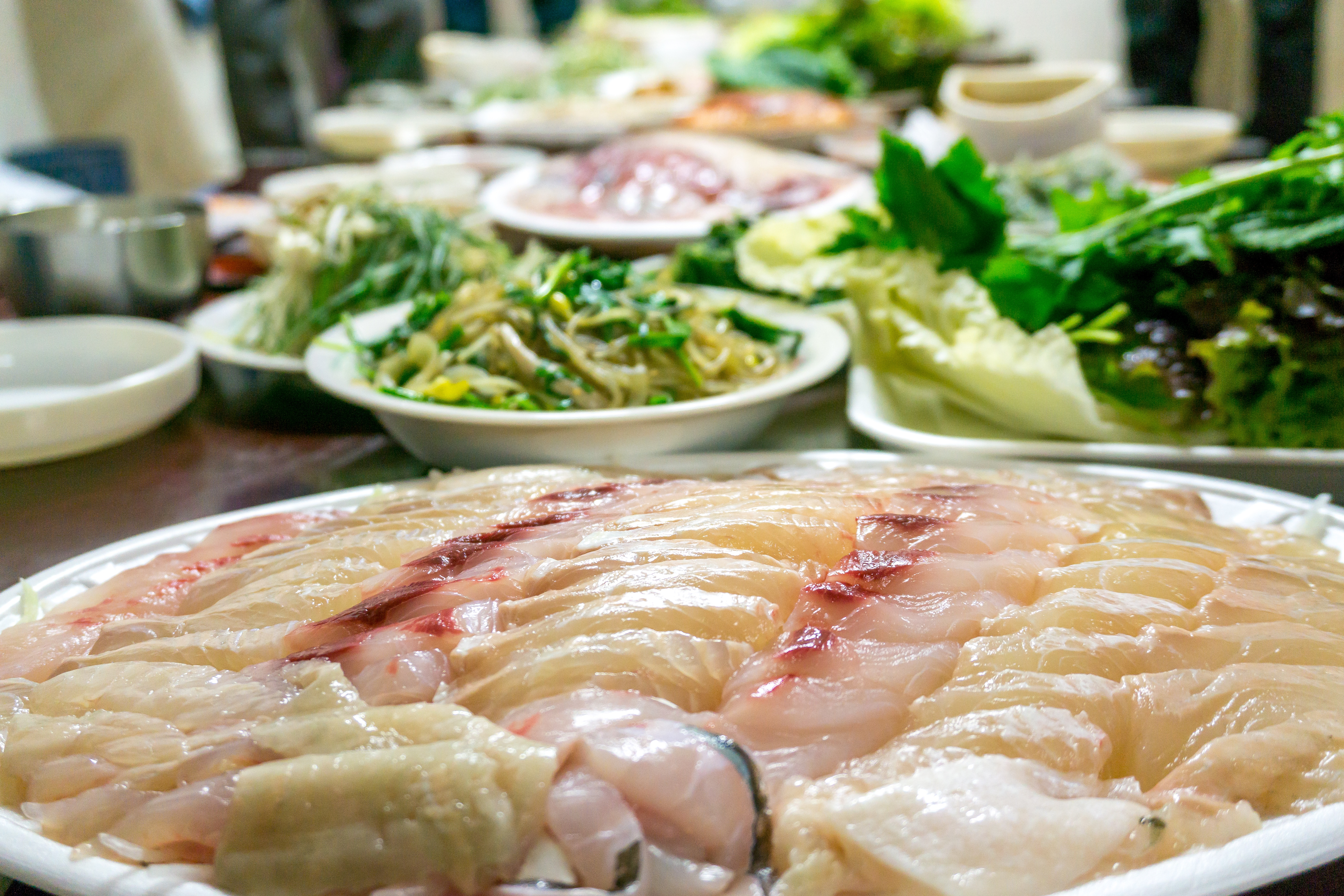
- Alternative names: Hwe
- Type: Raw fish
- Place of origin: Korea
- Associated cuisine: East Asian cuisine
- Variations: Yukhoe; sukhoe; ganghoe

Korean name
- Hangul: 회
- Hanja: 膾; 鱠
- RR: hoe
- MR: hoe
- IPA: [hwɛ]

Hoe (Korean: 회; pronounced [hwɛ]) is a Korean delicacy that is eaten by trimming raw meat or raw fish. It is similar to Japanese sashimi. In addition to fish, it is also made with other marine products such as shrimp and squid, shellfish, raw meat of land animals, and vegetable ingredients, but without any special prefix, it mainly refers to raw fish.

== Varieties ==
There are uncooked hoe (회) as well as blanched sukhoe (숙회).

=== Raw ===
Hoe (회), the raw fish or meat dish, can be divided into saengseon-hoe (생선회), filleted raw fish, and yukhoe (육회), sliced raw meat. Saengseon-hoe (생선회) can be either hwareo-hoe (활어회) made from freshly killed fish, or seoneo-hoe (선어회) made using aged fish.

- Baemjangeo-hoe (뱀장어회) – freshwater eel
- Baendaengi-hoe (밴댕이회) – sardinella
- Bangeo-hoe (방어회) – amberjack
- Bogeo-hoe (복어회) – fugu
- Bungeo-hoe (붕어회) – Crucian carp
- Chamchi-hoe (참치회) – tuna
- Dodari-hoe (도다리회) - Ridged eye Flounder
- Daegu-hoe (대구회) – cod
- Dorumuk-hoe (도루묵회) – sandfish
- Dom-hoe or Domi hoe (도미회) – sea bream
- Gaebul-hoe (개불회) - fat innkeeper worm
- Gajami-hoe (가자미회) – righteye flounder
- Galchi-hoe (갈치회) - largehead hairtail
- Gamulchi-hoe (가물치회) – snakehead
- Gehoe (게회) – crab
- Godeungeo-hoe (고등어회) – Mackerel
- Gul-hoe (굴회) – oyster
- Gwangeo-hoe (광어회) – Korean Halibut
- Haesam-hoe (해삼회) – sea cucumber
- Hongeo-hoe (홍어회) – skate
- Ingeo-hoe (잉어회) – carp
- Jari-hoe (자리회) – chromis
- Jeoneo-hoe (전어회) - konosirus
- Jogae-hoe (조개회) – clam
- Jogi-hoe (조기회) – yellow croaker
- Junchi-hoe (준치회) – ilisha
- Munggae-hoe (멍게회) - sea pineapple
- Mineo-hoe (민어회) – brown croaker
- Muneo-hoe (문어회) – giant octopus
- Myeongtae-hoe (명태회) – pollock
- Nakji-hoe (낙지회) – long arm octopus
- Nongeo-hoe (농어회) – seabass
- Saengbok-hoe (생복회) – abalone
- San-nakji (산낙지) – long arm octopus
- Songeo-hoe (송어회) – Trout
- Ssogari-hoe (쏘가리회) – mandarin fish
- Sungeo-hoe (숭어회) – mullet
- Ureok-hoe (우럭회) - refers to korean rockfish and Sebastes hubbsi
- Yeonoe-hoe (연어회) – Salmon

=== Blanched ===
Sukhoe (숙회) is a blanched fish, seafood, meat, or vegetable dish. Ganghoe (강회) is a dish of rolled and tied ribbons made with blanched vegetables such as water dropworts and scallions.

=== Mulhoe ===
Mulhoe (물회) is a dish made by mixing chopped freshly caught fish or squid with seasoning such as green onions, garlic, and chili powder and pouring water on them. It is considered a summer delicacy. Fishermen created this dish so they could have a simple meal while they were on board. It began to be sold commercially in the 1960s.

The dish differs by region. In Gangwon Province, squid mulhoe is consumed and vinegar is added. Gochujang is the main seasoning in Gangwon Province and North Gyeongsang Province while doenjang is used in South Gyeongsang Province and Jeju Island.

=== Khe ===
There is a variant of the dish in Sakhalin Korean cuisine called khe. One reported version of the dish served in the Uzbek Korean restaurant Cafe Lily in New York City used catfish that was cured in vinegar, then seasoned.

== Preparation ==
Hwareo-hoe (활어회) is prepared by filleting freshly killed fish, while seoneo-hoe (선어회) is made with aged fish in a similar way as Japanese sashimi: removing the blood and innards and aging the fish at a certain temperature before filleting. Fish or seafood hoe is often served with gochujang-based dipping sauces, such as cho-gochujang (chili paste mixed with vinegar) and ssamjang (chili paste mixed with soybean paste). Hoe is often eaten wrapped in ssam (wrap) vegetables, such as lettuce and perilla leaves. After eating hoe at a restaurant, maeun-tang (spicy fish stew) made with the bones, head, and the remaining meat of the fish, can be served as an add-on dish.

== History ==
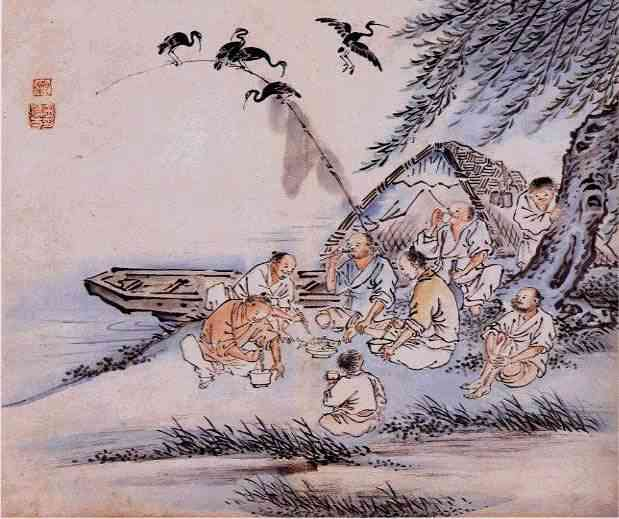
Gangbyeon hoeeum (lit. 'Eating hoe at riverside') drawn by Kim Deuk-sin (1754‒1822) depicts Korean people gathered to eat saengseon-hoe (raw fish dish) after fishing.

The Hankyoreh states that hoe was introduced to Korea from China during the Three Kingdoms period. From the mid–Three Kingdoms period until the late Goryeo Dynasty, hoe consumption declined because Buddhism discourages killing. It was consumed again in the late Goryeo dynasty and the Joseon dynasty because the state promoted Confucianism and Confucius was known to have enjoyed raw meat.

== Safety considerations ==
Consumption of raw hoe carries risks of parasitic and bacterial infections. Anisakis simplex, a nematode parasite found in many fish species, can cause anisakiasis with symptoms including urticaria, abdominal pain, and anaphylaxis. A Korean study found that flatfish (40%) and congers (40%) were the most frequently implicated seafood sources in Anisakis allergy patients. The parasite is killed by heating above 60°C for 10 minutes or freezing below −20°C for 24 hours.

The myxozoan parasite Kudoa septempunctata, found in olive flounder (gwangeo), has been shown to cause acute diarrhea and vomiting. A 2023 study demonstrated that K. septempunctata spores disrupt intestinal tight junctions and induce serotonin secretion, leading to gastroenteritis in animal models. Freshwater fish such as pond smelts (Hypomesus olidus), commonly eaten raw in Korea, have been found to harbor trematode metacercariae, including Clonorchis sinensis, which causes clonorchiasis. Bacterial contamination is also a concern; a 2016 cholera outbreak in South Korea was linked to raw seafood consumption, with Vibrio cholerae isolated from patients and coastal seawater.

Consumption of raw or undercooked seafood can also lead to infection with Vibrio vulnificus, which causes sepsis primarily in individuals with diabetes, chronic liver disease, or alcoholism. Reported case-fatality rates exceed 50%.

Health authorities have long recommended avoiding raw or undercooked freshwater fish, as they are the primary source of Clonorchis sinensis (liver fluke) infection.

== Gallery ==
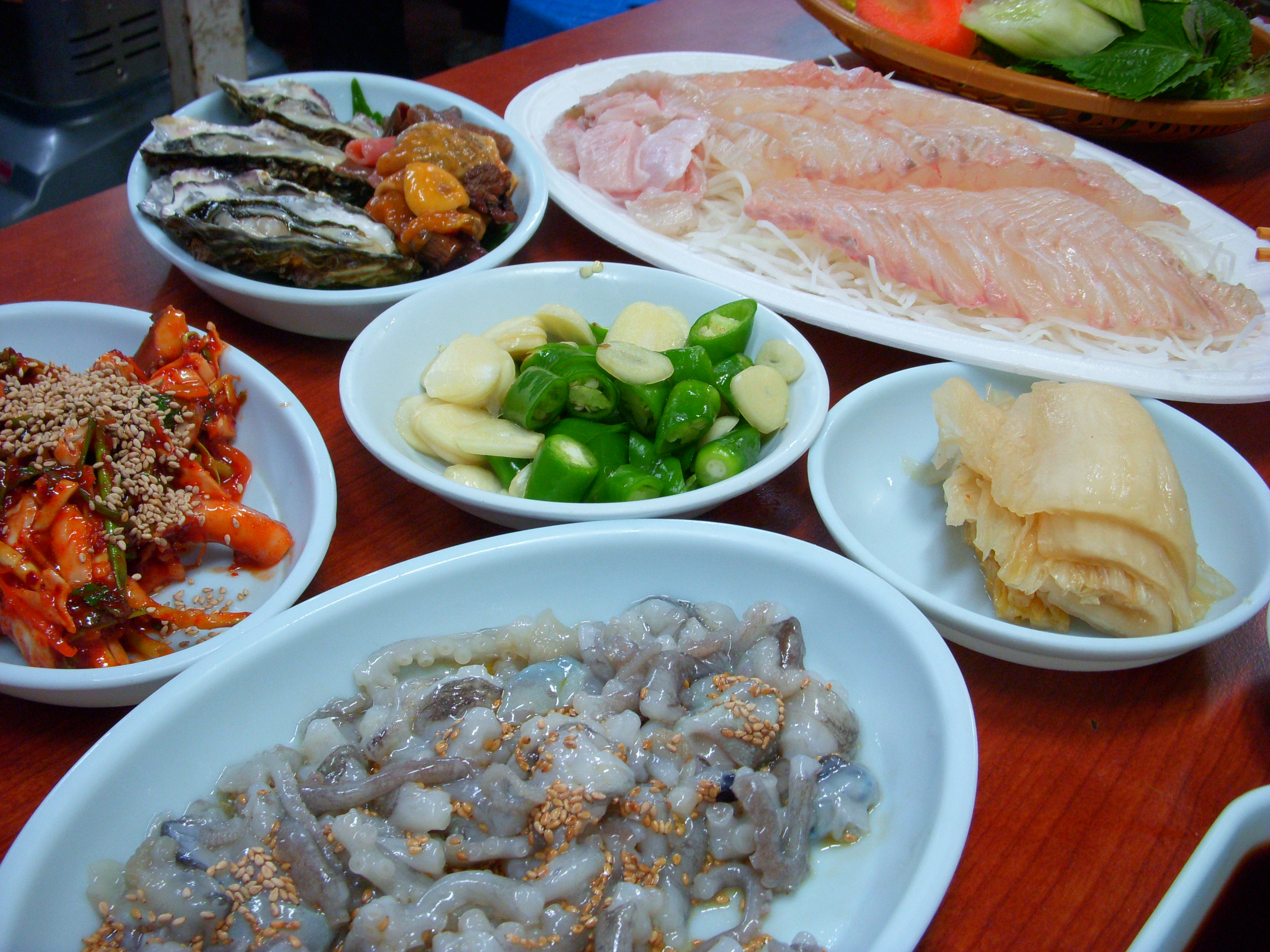
Various hoe from different species

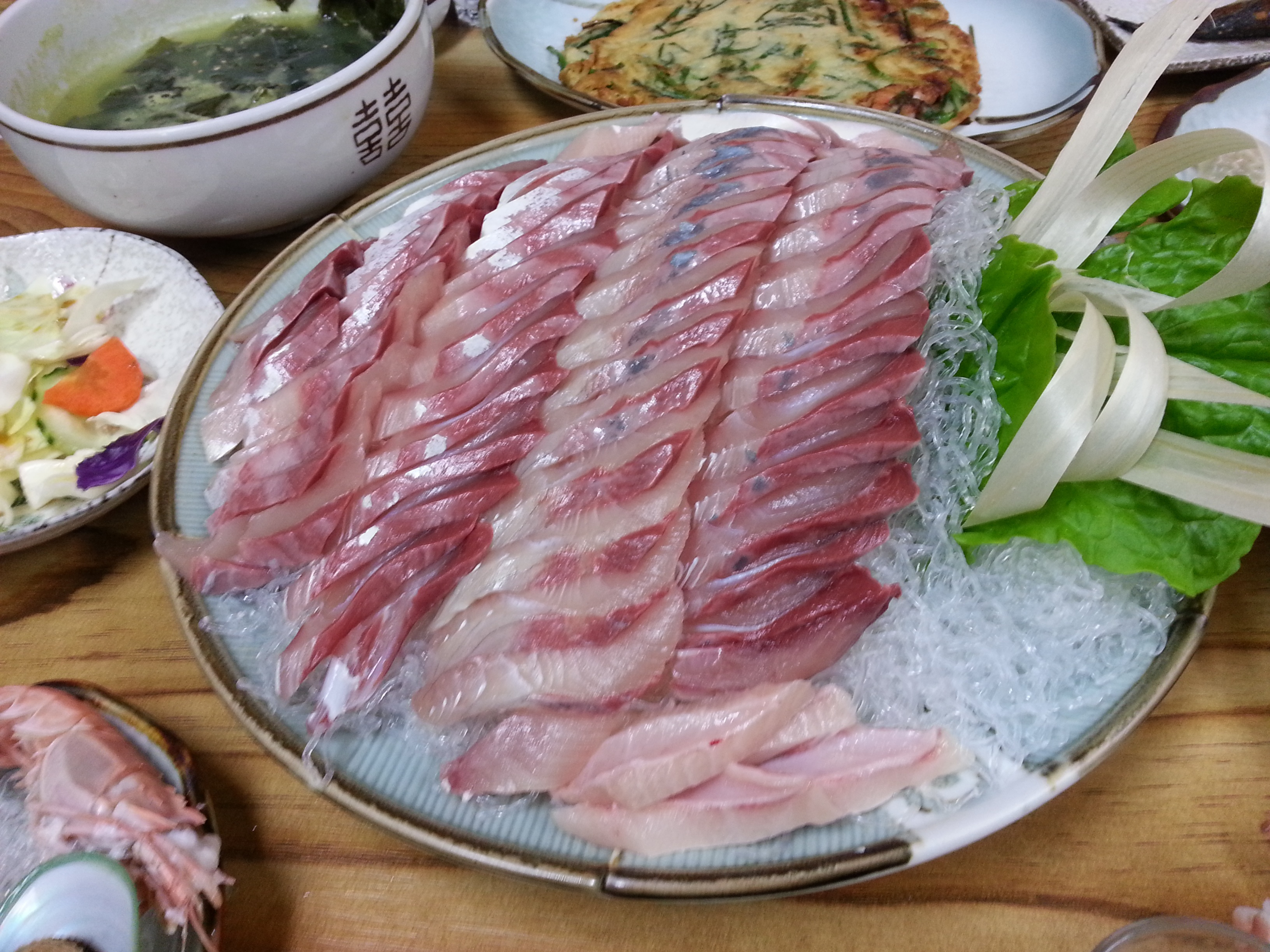
Bangeo-hoe (raw amberjack)

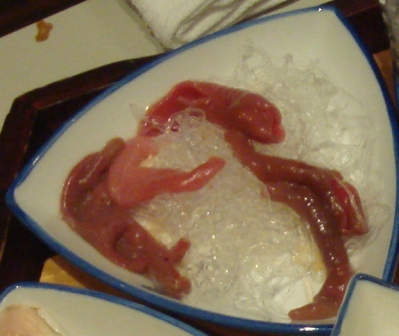
Gaebul-hoe (raw fat innkeeper worm)

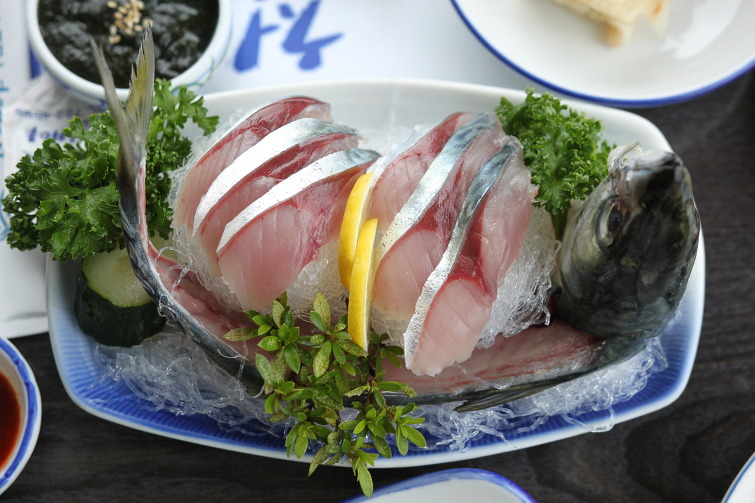
Godeungeo-hoe (raw chub mackerel)

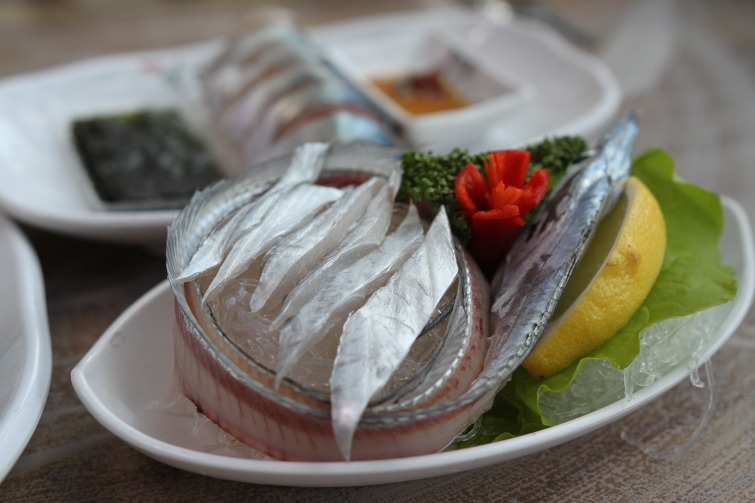
Galchi-hoe (raw largehead hairtail)

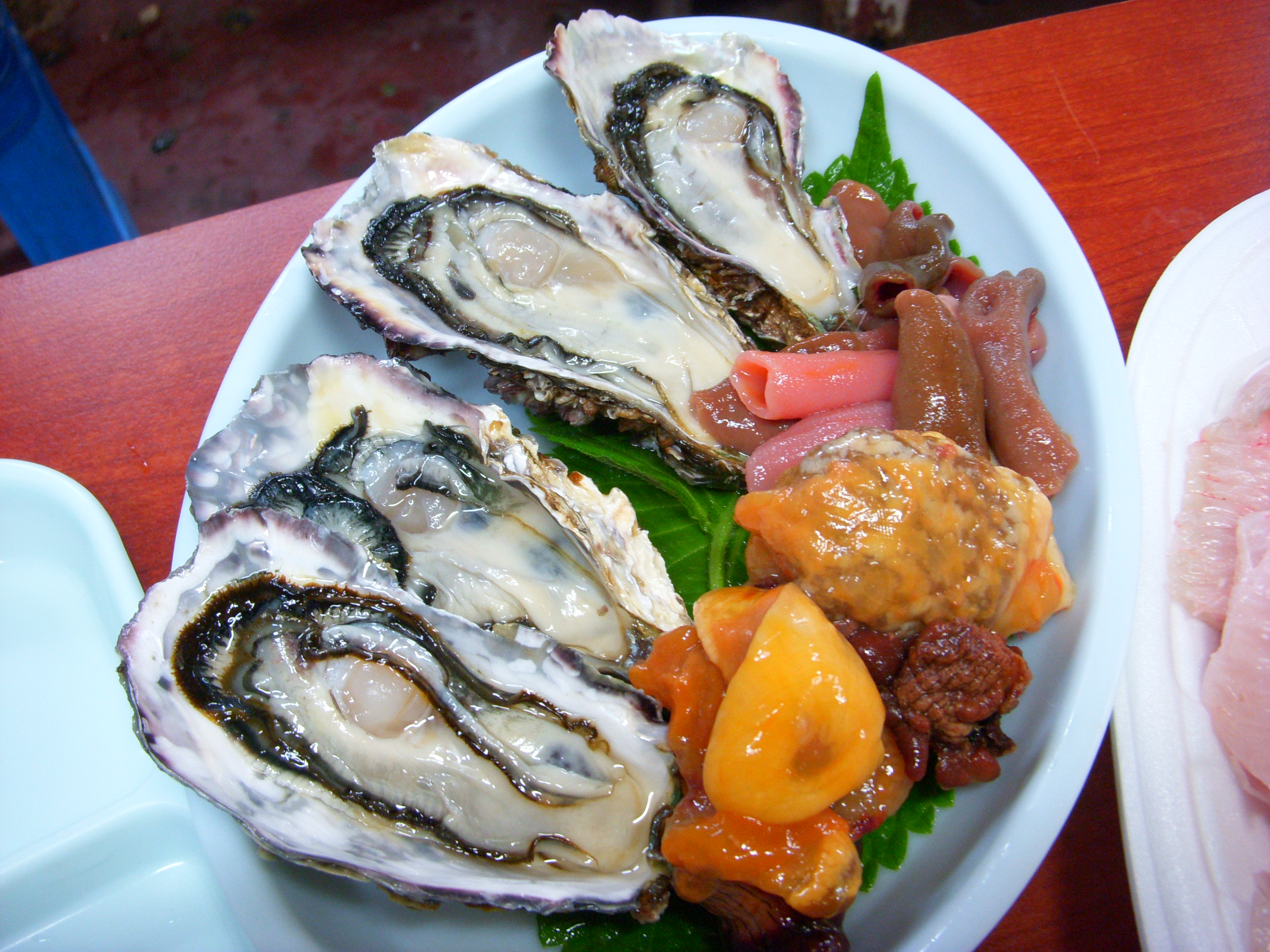
Gulhoe (raw oysters)

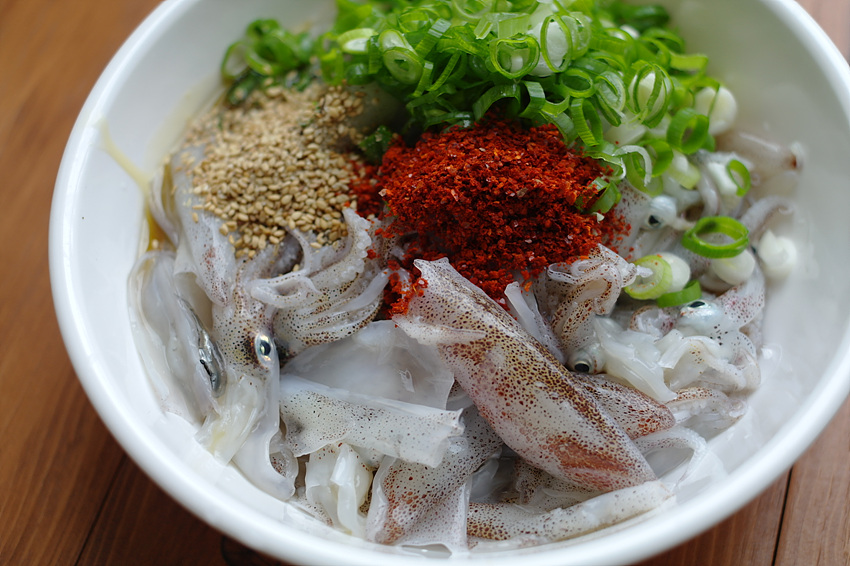
Horaegi-hoe (raw loliolus squid)

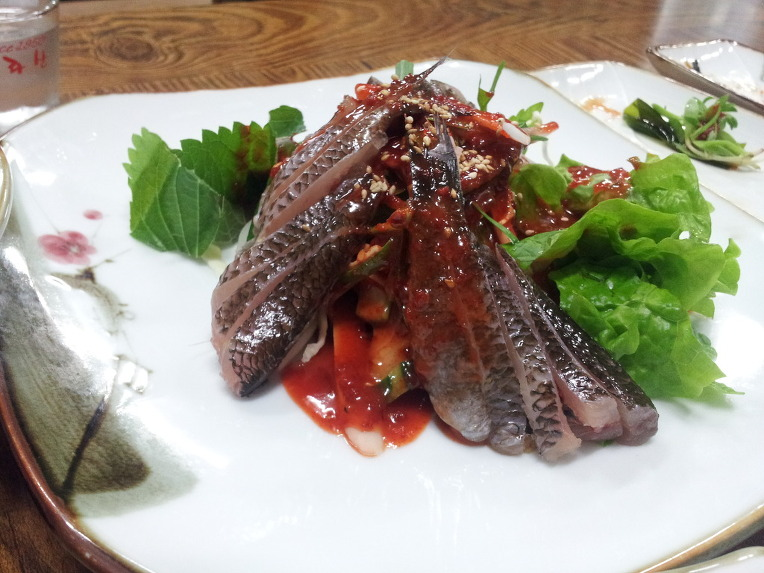
Jaridom-hoe (raw pearl-spot chromis)

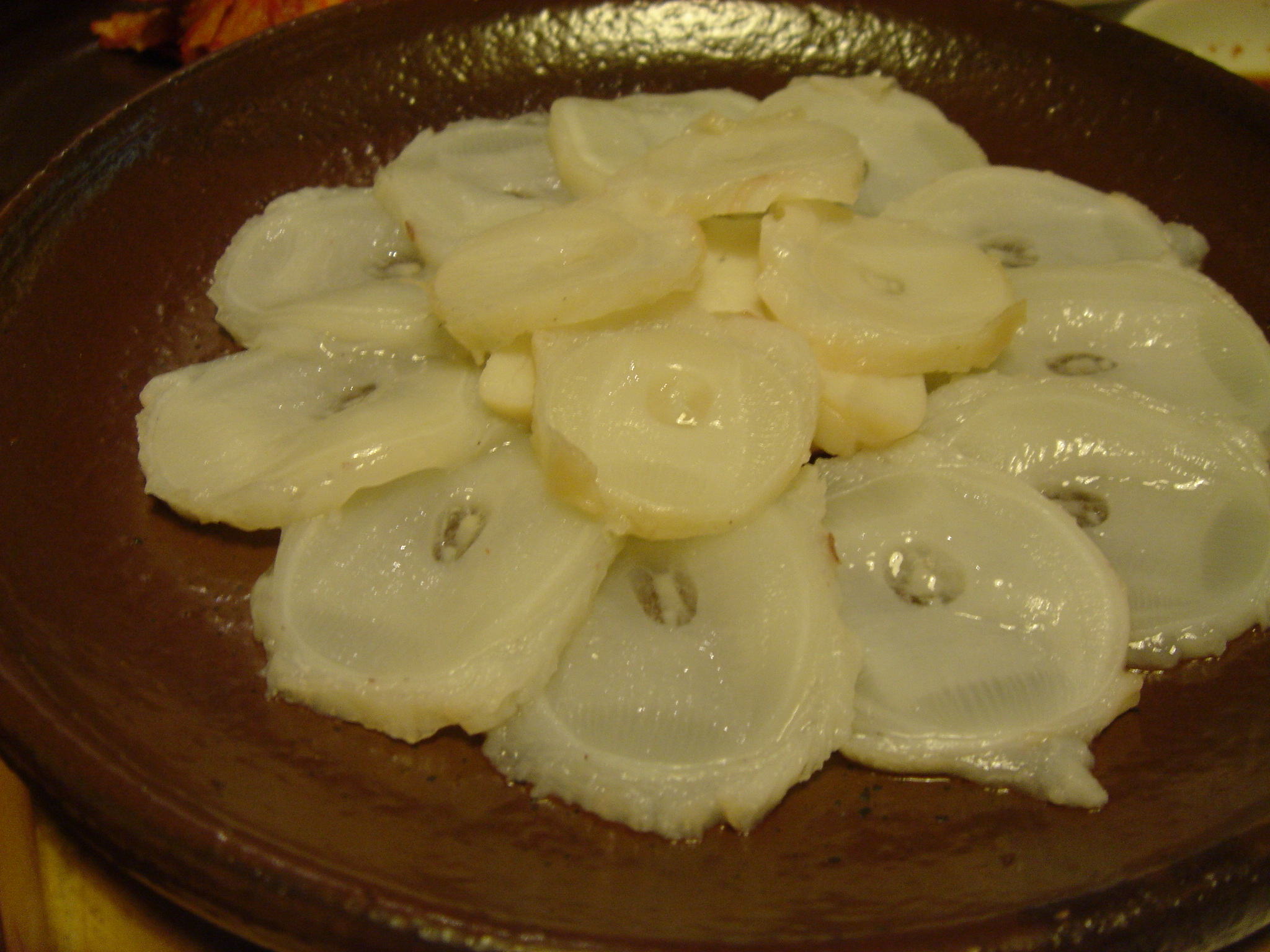
Muneo-hoe (raw giant octopus)

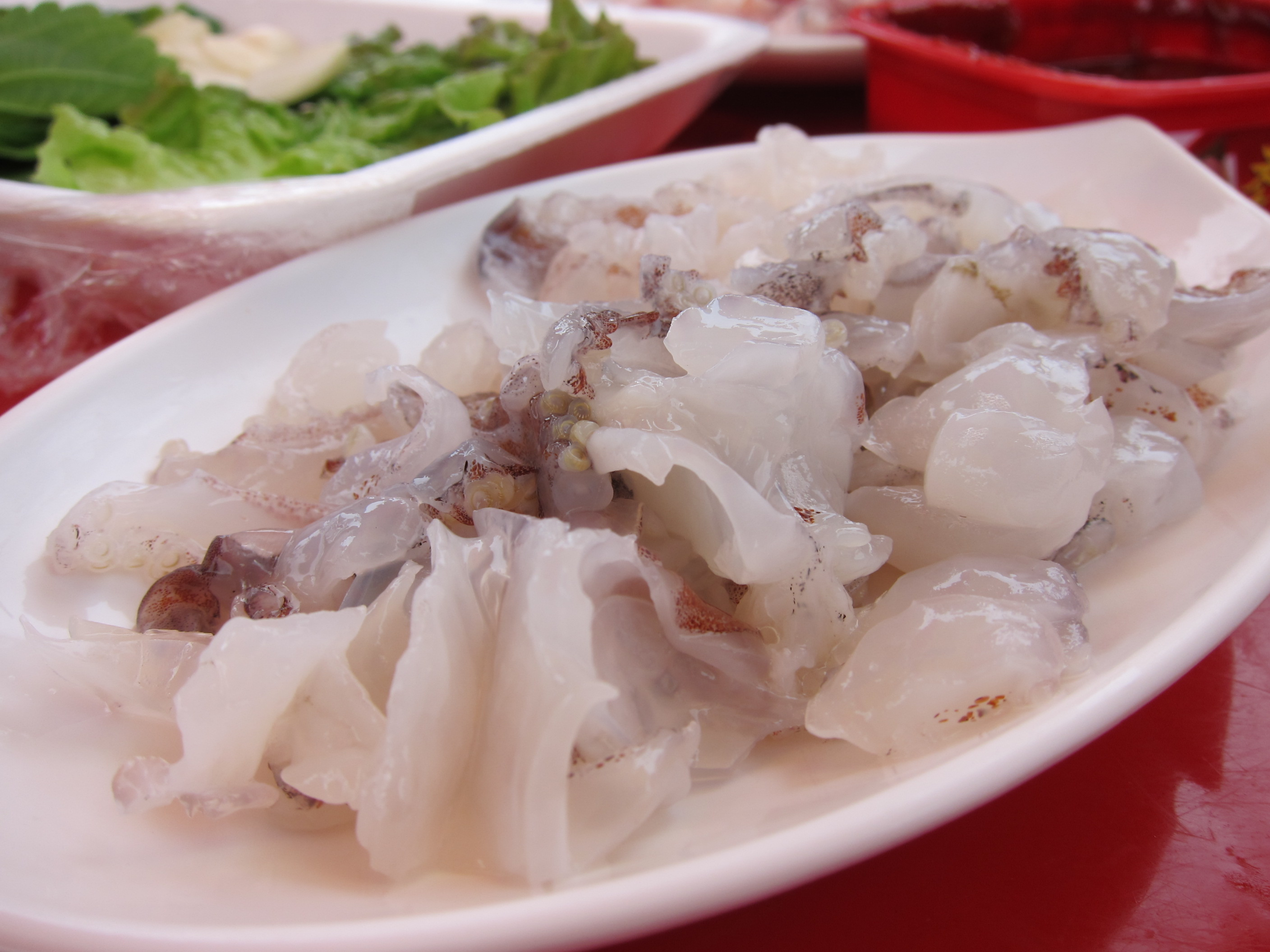
Ojingeo-hoe (raw flying squid)

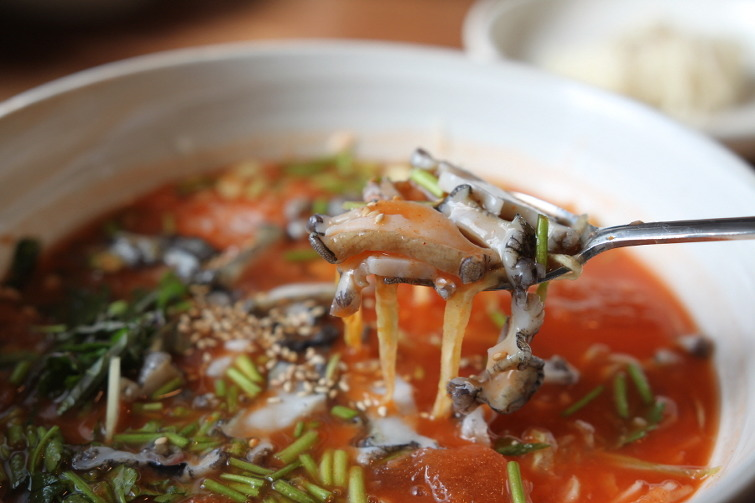
Jeonbok-mulhoe (cold raw abalone soup)

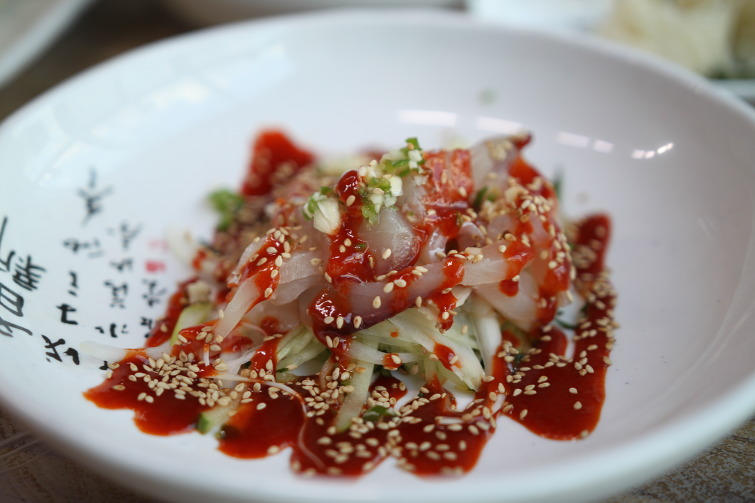
Hoe-muchim (seasoned hoe salad)

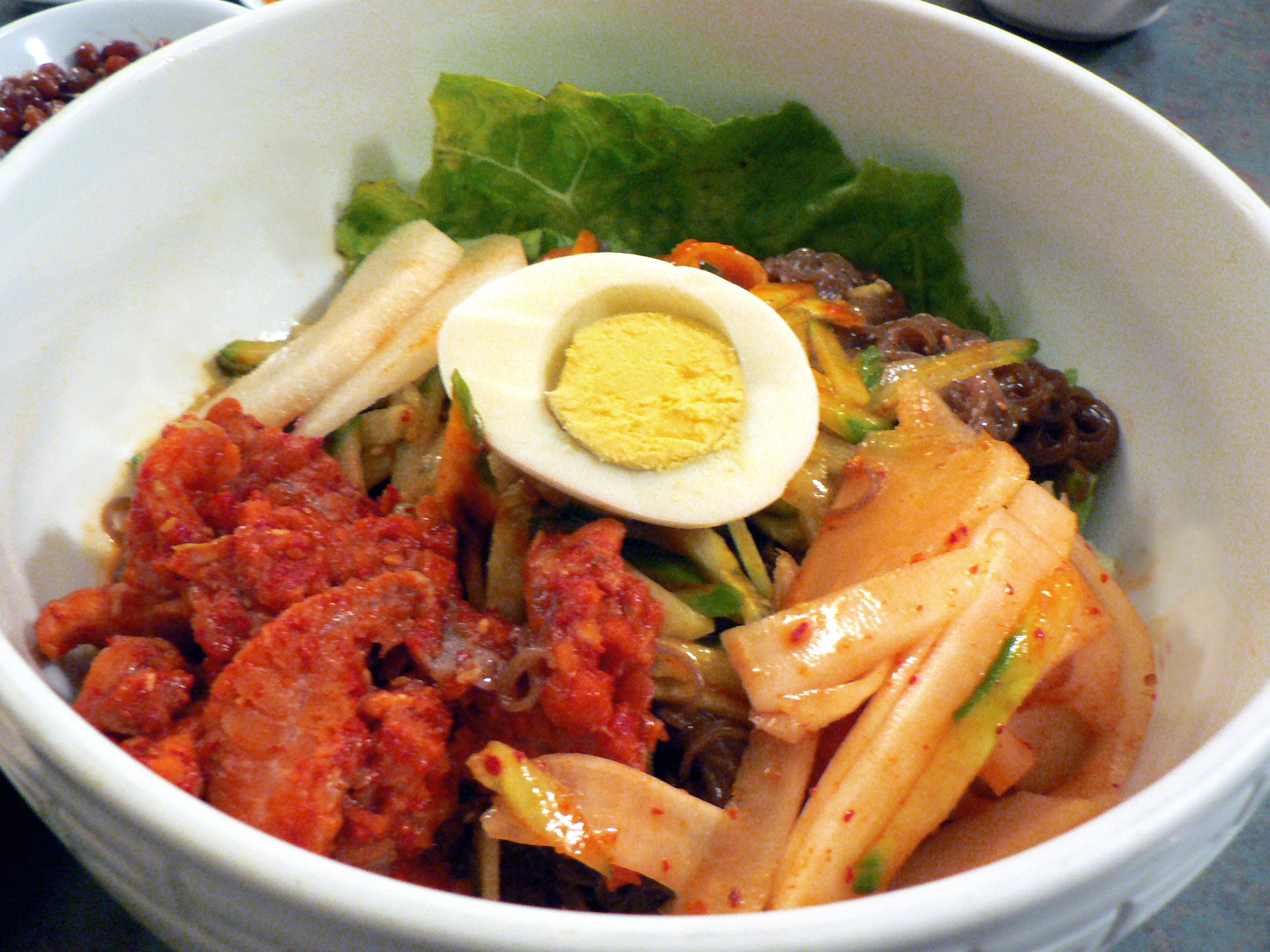
Hoe-naengmyeon (cold noodles with hoe)

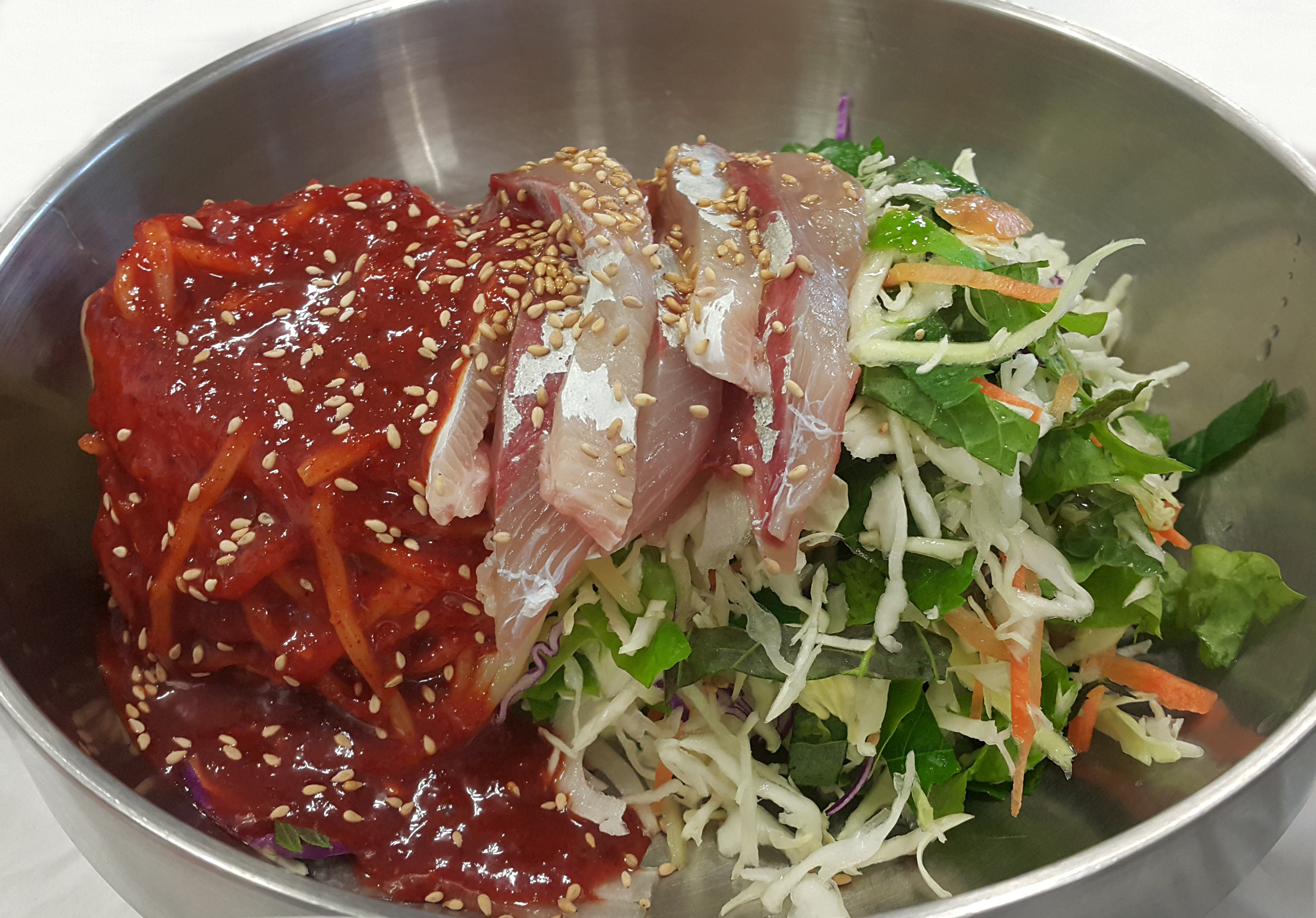
Hoe-deopbap (bibimbap with hoe)

== See also ==
- Hoedeopbap
- Kuai (dish)
- Maeuntang
- Namasu
- Rui-be
- Sannakji
- Sashimi
- Yusheng
