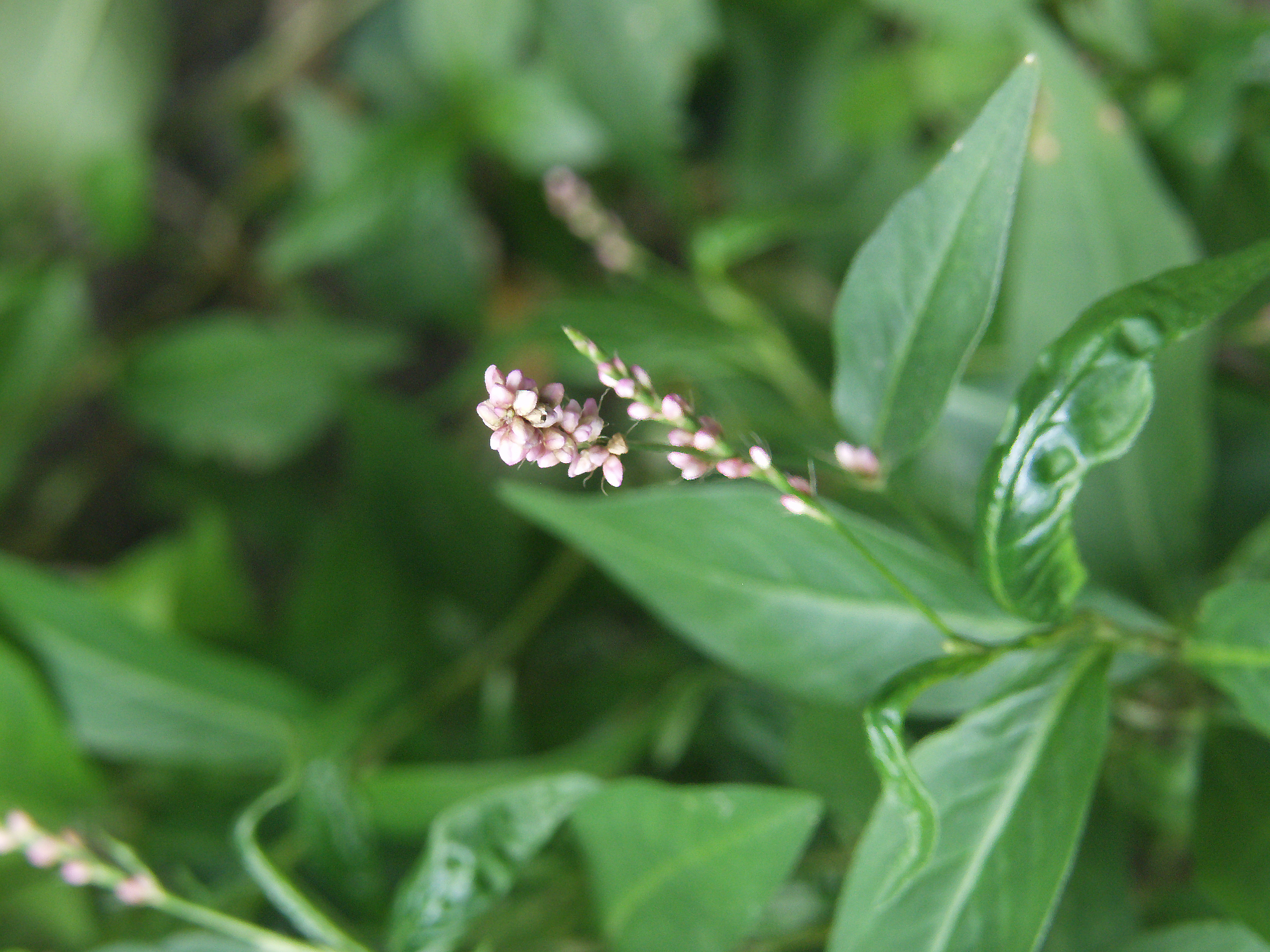

Scientific classification
- Kingdom: Plantae
- Clade: Embryophytes
- Clade: Tracheophytes
- Clade: Angiosperms
- Clade: Eudicots
- Order: Caryophyllales
- Family: Polygonaceae
- Genus: Persicaria
- Species: P. cespitosa

Binomial name
- Persicaria cespitosa (Blume) Nakai

Synonyms
- Polygonum cespitosum Blume

= Persicaria cespitosa =

Tufted knotweed

Species of flowering plant

Persicaria cespitosa (synonym Polygonum cespitosum), known as tufted knotweed, is a summer annual weedy plant of the family Polygonaceae, native to eastern Asia, from China to Japan and Southeast Asia, and introduced into North America. The plant grows to 3.5 feet (105 cm) in height with elliptic to lanceolate leaves, usually 20–75 mm (0.4–30.0 inches) long. It has small pink or red flowers arranged in tight terminal spikes.

Tufted knotweed is similar to other Persicaria species, particularly Persicaria maculosa (lady's thumb). Around the stem of both these species there is a papery sheath known as an ocrea with stiff spine-like hairs at the top, but in P. cespitosa these hairs are much longer, as long as the visible portion of the ocrea, whereas in P. maculosa they are much shorter.

== Taxonomy ==
There is some confusion over the identity of Persicaria cespitosa. Some sources regard it as an independent species, others only as a synonym for Persicaria posumbu.
