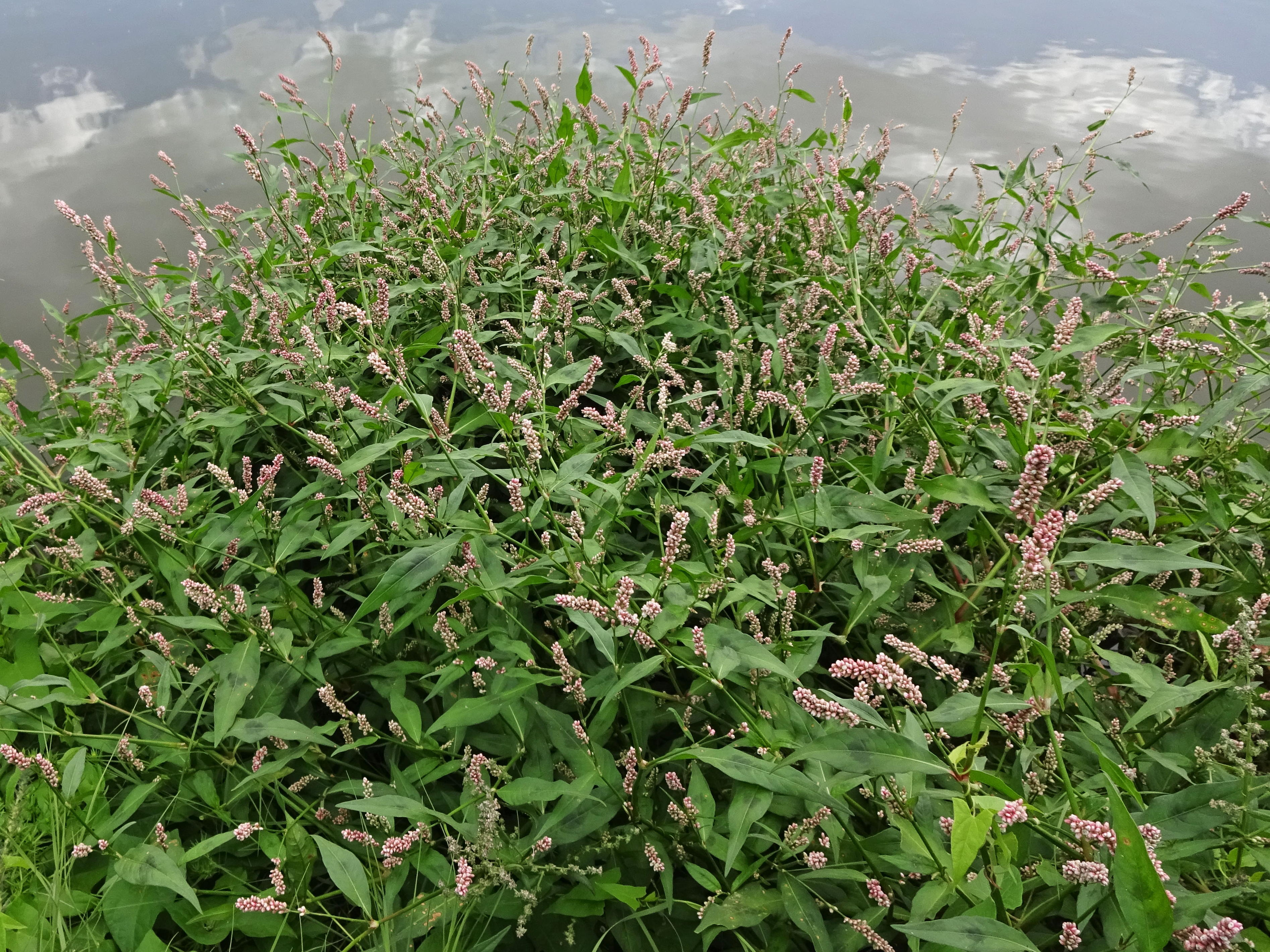
- Growing in the Farmington Bay area, Utah

Conservation status
- Least Concern (IUCN 3.1)

- Apparently Secure (NatureServe)

Scientific classification
- Kingdom: Plantae
- Clade: Embryophytes
- Clade: Tracheophytes
- Clade: Angiosperms
- Clade: Eudicots
- Order: Caryophyllales
- Family: Polygonaceae
- Genus: Persicaria
- Species: P. maculosa

Binomial name
- Persicaria maculosa Gray

Synonyms
- Synonymy: Persicaria mitis Delarbre; Persicaria persicaria (L.) Small; Persicaria ruderalis C.F.Reed; Peutalis persicaria (L.) Raf.; Polygonon persicarium (L.) St.-Lag.; Polygonum persicaria L.; Polygonum ruderale Salisb.

= Persicaria maculosa =

Species of flowering plant in the knotweed family

Persicaria maculosa (syn. Polygonum persicaria) is an annual plant in the buckwheat family, Polygonaceae. Common names include lady's thumb, spotted lady's thumb, Jesusplant, and redshank. It is widespread across Eurasia from Iceland south to Portugal and east to Japan. It is also present as an introduced and invasive species in North America, where it was first noted in the Great Lakes region in 1843 and has now spread through most of the continent.

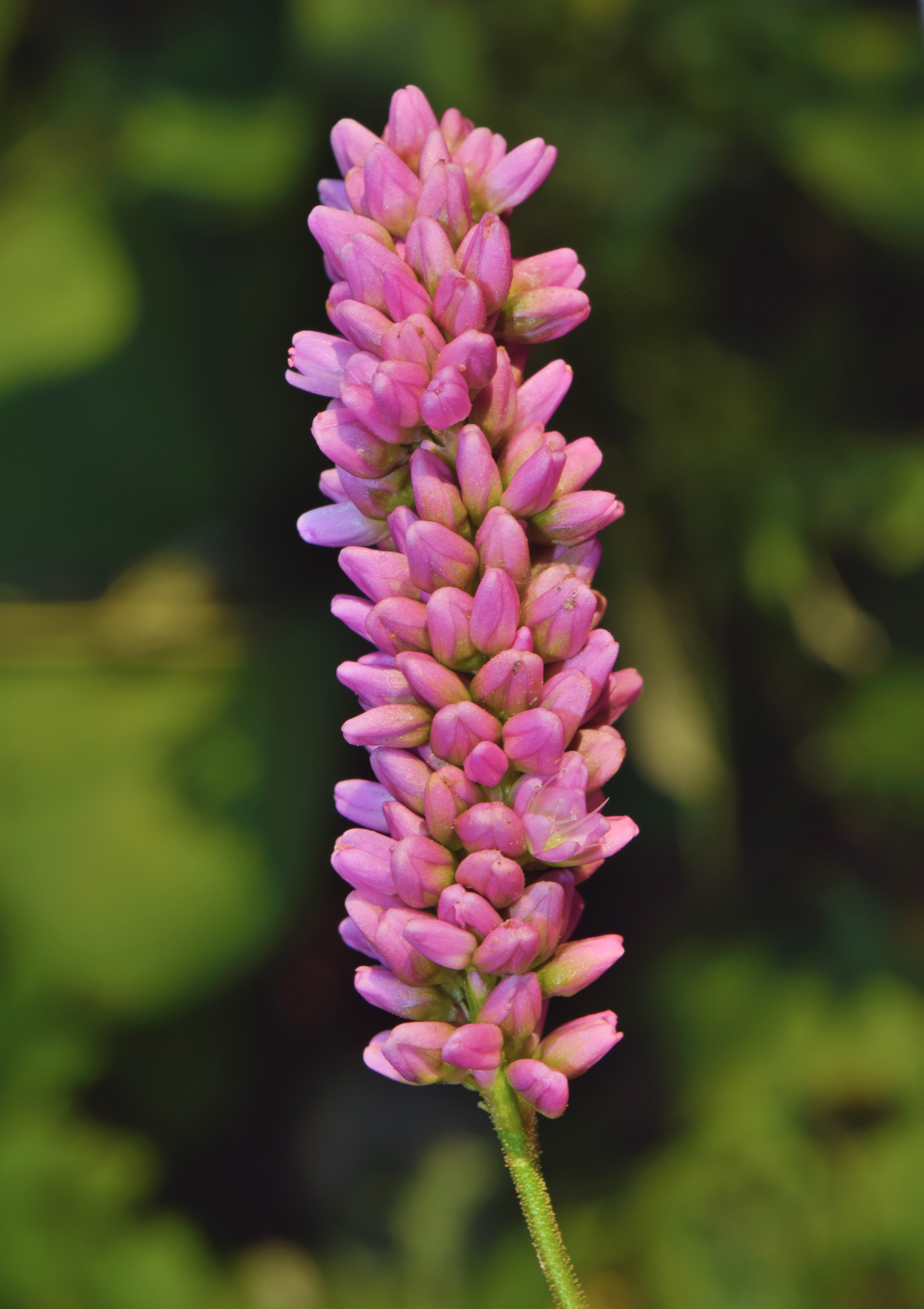
Inflorescence

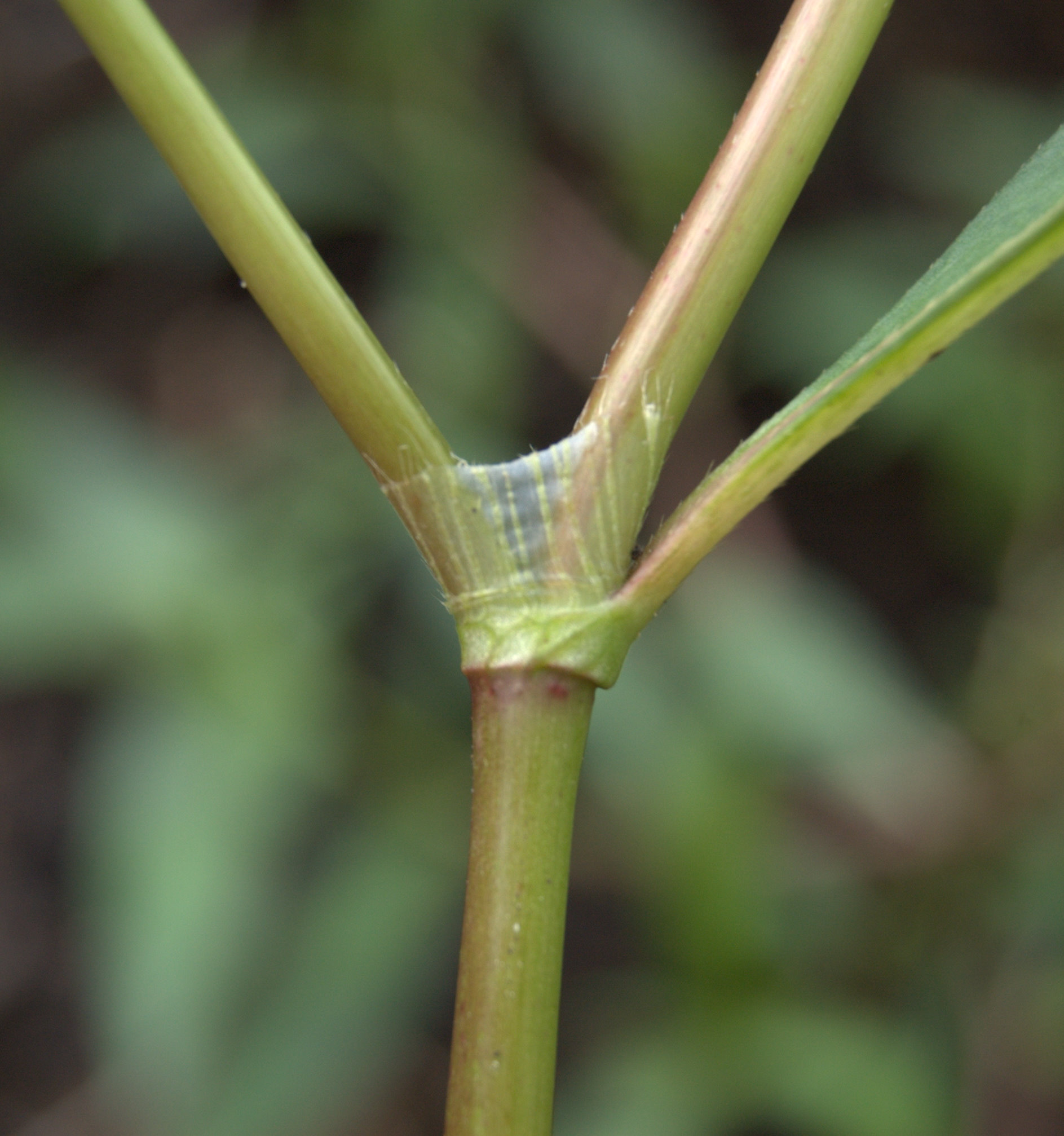
The ochrea: stipules fused around the stem

== Description ==
Persicaria maculosa is an annual herb up to 1 metre (3 ft 3 in) tall, with an erect, rather floppy stem with swollen joints. The leaves are alternate and almost stalkless. The leaf blades often have a brown or black spot in the centre and are narrowly ovate and have entire margins. Each leaf base has stipules which are fused into a stem-enclosing sheath that is loose and fringed with long hairs at the upper end. The inflorescence is a dense spike. The perianth of each tiny pink flower consists of four or five lobes, fused near the base. There are six stamens, two fused carpels and two styles. The fruit is a shiny black, three-edged achene. This plant flowers from July to September in the temperate Northern Hemisphere.

== Taxonomy ==
The species was first described, as Polygonum persicaria, by Carl Linnaeus in 1753. It was first successfully transferred to the genus Persicaria by Samuel Frederick Gray in 1821, under the name Persicaria maculosa. The name "Persicaria persicaria" cannot be used because tautonyms – binomial names that use the same word for both the genus and the species epithet – are prohibited by the International Code of Nomenclature for algae, fungi, and plants, and a replacement name (nomen novum) must be used. For this reason the transfer of the species to Persicaria by John Kunkel Small in 1903, which used the tautonym, is invalid.

== Distribution and habitat ==
Persicaria maculosa is native to Europe and Asia, where it can be mistaken for Polygonum minus. The latter has narrower leaves, usually less than 1 cm wide. It has been introduced to North America and is naturalised throughout the mainland continent, growing along roadsides, riverbanks, and on fallow ground. In the United States, it is very similar to Pennsylvania smartweed, but redshank has a fringe of hairs at the top of the ochrea, something which Pennsylvania smartweed lacks. The species has also been found in New Zealand and Australia.

== Ecology ==
In the British Isles, this plant is a weed, without natural habitat, and always associated with human activity. It likes moist soils, particularly rich ones, and acid peaty loams. It does not like lime, and liming is cited as a means to fight it.

== Cultivation and uses ==
Persicaria maculosa contains persicarin and tannins. The young leaves may be eaten as a leaf vegetable. It is often seen as a weed and rarely cultivated. A yellow dye can be produced from this plant with alum used as a mordant.
