= Polygonum gracile =

Polygonum gracile is a scientific name that has been published six times and is considered botanical synonym of five species of plant:

- Fagopyrum esculentum (cultivated buckwheat), synonym published in 1855 by Carl Meissner
- Persicaria hydropiper, synonym published in 1796 by Richard Anthony Salisbury
- Persicaria hydropiper, synonym published in 1810 by Robert Brown (1773–1858)
- Persicaria posumbu subsp. posumbu, synonym published in 1865 by Friedrich Anton Wilhelm Miquel
- Polygonum bellardii, synonym published in 1855 by Giovanni Gussone
- Polygonum tenerum, synonym published in 1818 by Thomas Nuttall
