= Polygonum maculatum =

Polygonum maculatum is a taxonomic name that has been published three times and is the botanical synonym of two species of plant:

- Persicaria lapathifolia, synonym Polygonum maculatum Krock. published in 1823 by Anton Johann Krocker (1744–1823)
- Persicaria lapathifolia, synonym Polygonum maculatum (Sibth.) Bab. published in 1874 by Charles Cardale Babington (1808–1895)
- Persicaria pensylvanica, synonym Polygonum maculatum Raf. published in 1817 by Constantine Samuel Rafinesque (1783–1840)
