= Persicaria posumbu =

Scientific classification
- Kingdom: Plantae
- Clade: Tracheophytes
- Clade: Angiosperms
- Clade: Eudicots
- Order: Caryophyllales
- Family: Polygonaceae
- Genus: Persicaria
- Species: P. posumbu

Binomial name
- Persicaria posumbu (Buch.-Ham. ex D.Don) H.Gross

Synonyms
- Persicaria yokusaiana (Makino) Nakai; Polygonum posumbu Buch.-Ham. ex D.Don; Polygonum yokusaianum Makino

Species of plant

Persicaria posumbu is a species of flowering plant in the family Polygonaceae. It was first described as Polygonum posumbu in 1825 and transferred to the genus Persicaria in 1919. Plants of the World Online records it as having a discontinuous native distribution: the Assam region, Bangladesh and the eastern Himalayas to the west, and Japan, Korea, the Kuril Islands and Primorye to the east.

There is some confusion over the relationship between Persicaria posumbu and Persicaria cespitosa. Some sources regard P. cespitosa as an independent species, others regard P. cespitosa as a synonym of P. posumbu.

== Image Gallery ==
Leaf hairs

Adventitious roots

Ochrea

Leaves
