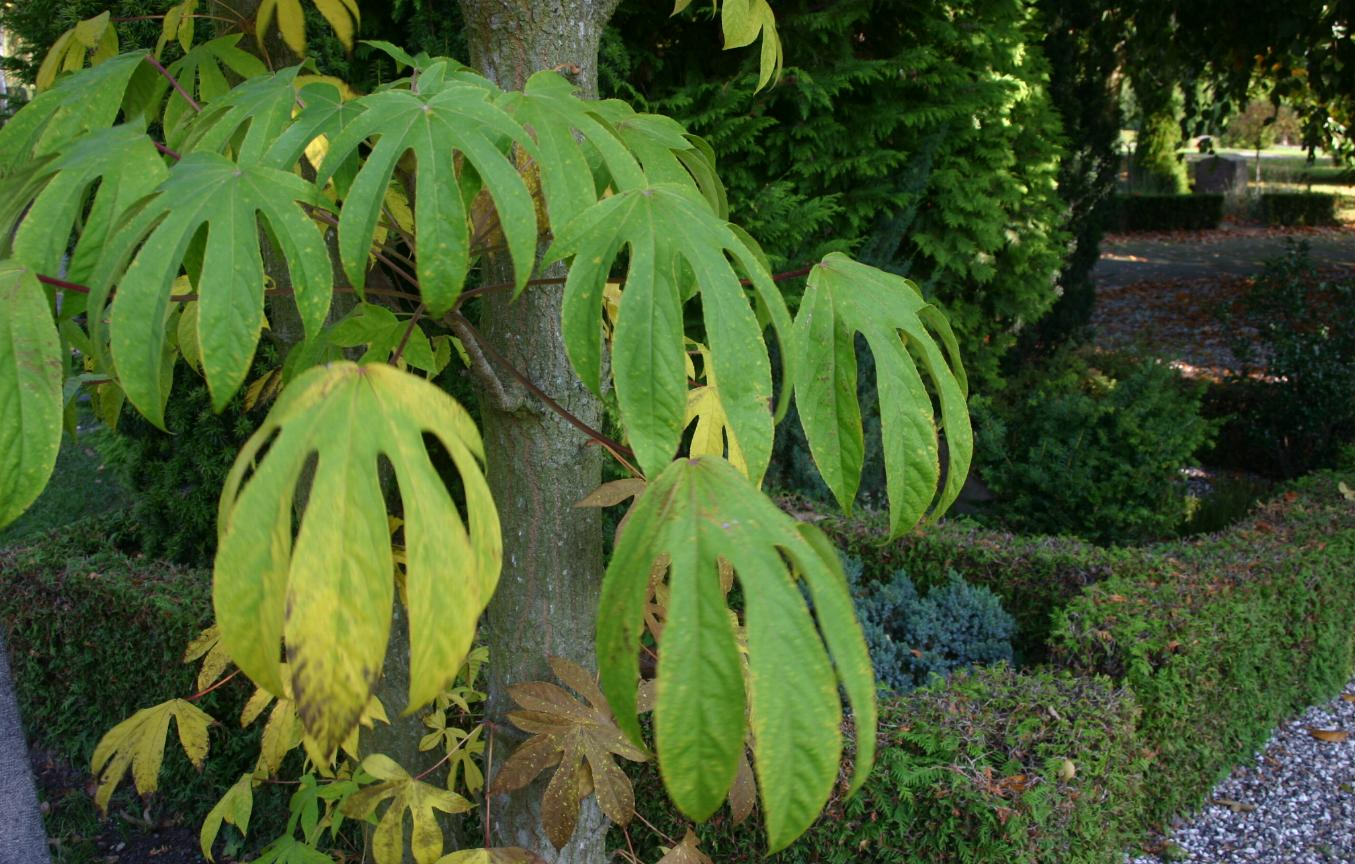

Scientific classification
- Kingdom: Plantae
- Clade: Tracheophytes
- Clade: Angiosperms
- Clade: Eudicots
- Clade: Asterids
- Order: Apiales
- Family: Araliaceae
- Subfamily: Aralioideae
- Genus: Kalopanax; Miq.
- Species: K. septemlobus

Binomial name
- Kalopanax septemlobus (Thunb. ex A.Murray bis) Koidz.

Synonyms
- Kalopanax pictus (Thunb.) Nakai

= Kalopanax =

Genus of trees

Kalopanax septemlobus, common names castor aralia, tree aralia, and prickly castor oil tree, is a deciduous tree in the family Araliaceae, the sole species in the genus Kalopanax. It is native to northeastern Asia, from Sakhalin and Japan west to southwestern China. It is called cìqiū (刺楸) in Chinese, eumnamu (음나무) in Korean, and harigiri (ハリギリ; 針桐) in Japanese.

== Description ==
The tree grows to 30 metres (98 ft) tall, with a trunk up to 1–1.5 metres (3.3–4.9 ft) diameter. The stems are often spiny, with stout spines up to 1 centimetre (0.39 in) long. The leaves are alternate, in appearance similar to a large Fatsia or Liquidambar (sweetgum) leaf, 15–35 centimetres (5.9–13.8 in) across, palmately lobed with five or seven lobes, each lobe with a finely toothed margin.

The leaf lobes vary greatly in shape, from shallow lobes to cut nearly to the leaf base. Trees with deeply lobed leaves were formerly distinguished as K. septemlobus var. maximowiczii, but the variation is continuous and not correlated with geography, so it is no longer regarded as distinct.

The flowers are produced in late summer in large umbels 20–50 centimetres (7.9–19.7 in) across at the apex of a stem, each flower with 4–5 small white petals. The fruit is a small black drupe containing two seeds.

== Cultivation and spread ==
The tree is cultivated as an ornamental tree for the "tropical" appearance of its large palmate leaves in Europe and North America; despite its tropical looks, it is very hardy, tolerating temperatures down to at least −40 °C (−40 °F). The plant grows very quickly at first, however slowing in growth rate when reaching around 40 years old.

The tree has been found growing wild in several US states, including New Hampshire, Connecticut, and Maryland. It is viewed with concern by the US National Park Service and the Maryland Department of Natural Resources.

== Culinary use ==
In Korea, young shoots, called eumnamu-sun, are often eaten as sukhoe (blanched dish).

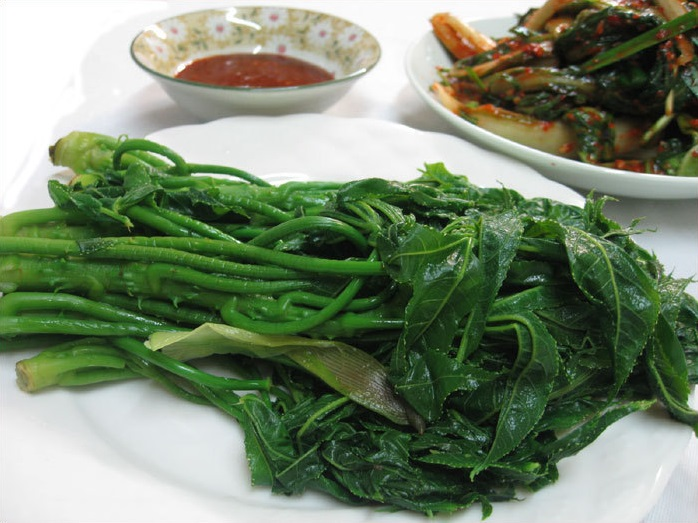
Eumnamu-sun-sukhoe (blanched tree aralia shoots) served with vinegar-gochujang mixture as dipping sauce
