= Loliolus uyii =

Conservation status
- Data Deficient (IUCN 3.1)

Scientific classification
- Kingdom: Animalia
- Phylum: Mollusca
- Class: Cephalopoda
- Order: Myopsida
- Family: Loliginidae
- Genus: Loliolus
- Species: L. uyii

Binomial name
- Loliolus uyii (Wakiya & Ishikawa, 1921)

Synonyms
- List: Loligo (Nipponololigo) uyii Wakiya & Ishikawa, 1921; Loligo aspera Ortmann, 1888; Loligo gotoi Sasaki, 1929; Loligo tago Sasaki, 1929; Loligo uyii Wakiya & Ishikawa, 1921; Loliolus (Nipponololigo) uyii (Wakiya & Ishikawa, 1921)

Species of squid

Loliolus uyii, commonly known as the little squid, is a species of squid in the family Loliginidae. L. uyii is found in temperate and tropical Indo-west Pacific Ocean. It occurs at a depth of 50 m, and has a mantle length of 113 mm.
