= Ganghoe =

Korean fish and vegetable dish

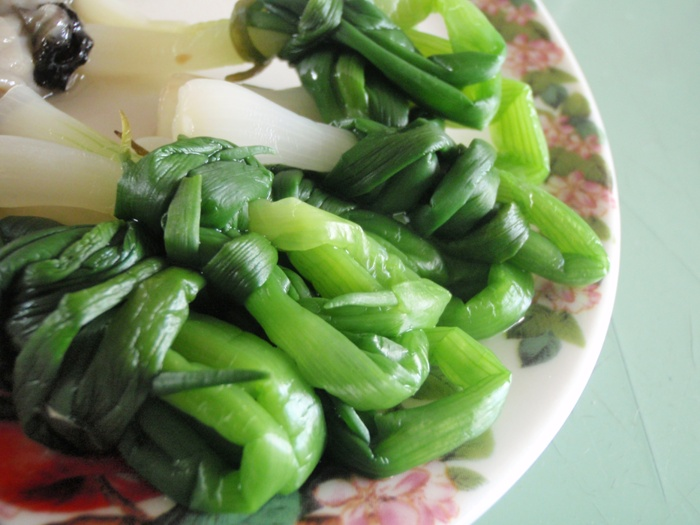
- Jjokpa-ganghoe (scallion bundles)
- Type: Hoe
- Place of origin: Korea
- Associated cuisine: Korean cuisine

Korean name
- Hangul: 강회
- Hanja: 강膾
- RR: ganghoe
- MR: kanghoe
- IPA: kaŋ.ɦwe̞

Ganghoe (Korean: 강회) is a variety of hoe dish of rolled and tied ribbons made with blanched vegetables such as minari (Oenanthe javanica) and silpa (thread scallions). Sometimes, the vegetables are bundled into ribbons, while other times, they are tied around layered ingredients such as pyeonyuk (pressed meat slices), egg garnish, and chili threads or blanched seafood (called sukhoe). Vegetarian versions are a part of Korean temple cuisine. Ganghoe is usually dipped in chojang, the mixture made of gochujang and vinegar.

== Varieties ==
- Gosu-ganghoe (고수강회) – Raw coriander is bundled and eaten with chojang (dipping sauce made with gochujang and vinegar).
- Hallyeon-ganghoe (한련강회) – Fresh Indian cress leaves, stems, and sees are bundled and served with in gochujang.
- Minari-ganghoe (미나리강회) – Blanched minari (Oenanthe javanica) is tied around a 3 centimetres (1.2 in)-thick piece of pyeonyuk (pressed meat) or white part of daepa (big scallions), that is topped with chili threads and a pine nut. It is commonly served as anju or banchan.
- Pa-ganghoe (파강회) – Blanched silpa (thread scallions) are tied around pyeonyuk, that is topped with a pine nut.
- Silpa-ganghoe (실파강회) – Blanched silpa is bundled into ribbons and served with chojang.
- Ssukgat-ganghoe (쑥갓강회) – Blanched crown daisy greens are bundled into ribbons and served with chojang.

== Gallery ==
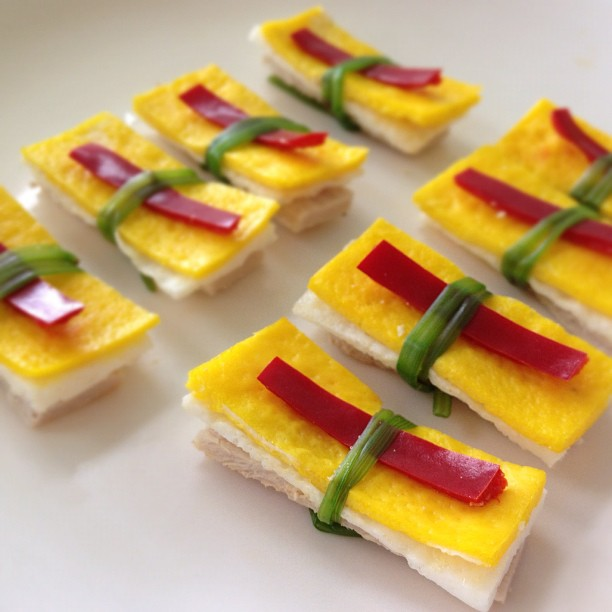
Minari-ganghoe (water dropwort bundles)

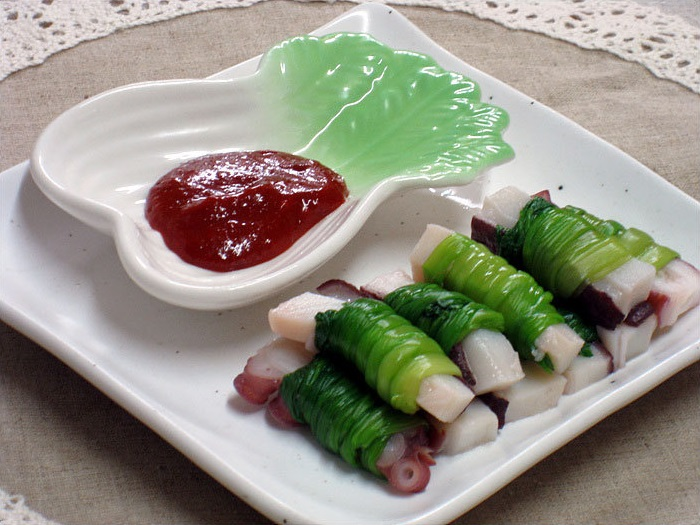
Minari-ojingeo-ganghoe (water dropwort bundles with squid), served with chojang

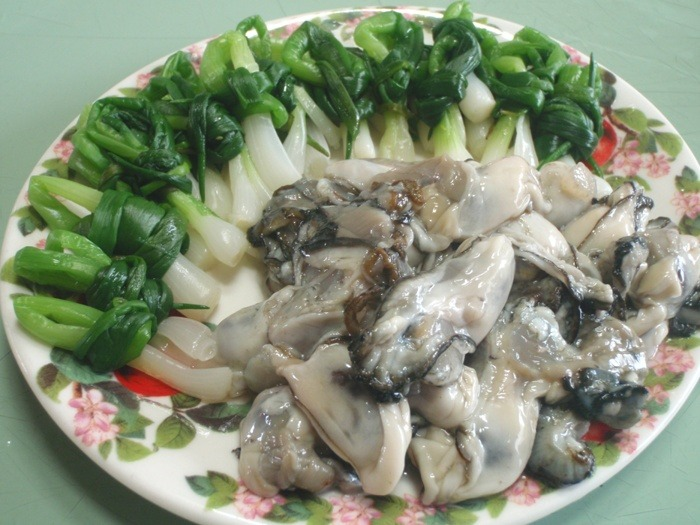
Gulhoe (fresh oysters) and jjokpa-ganghoe (scallion bundles)

== See also ==
- Sukhoe
- List of rolled foods
