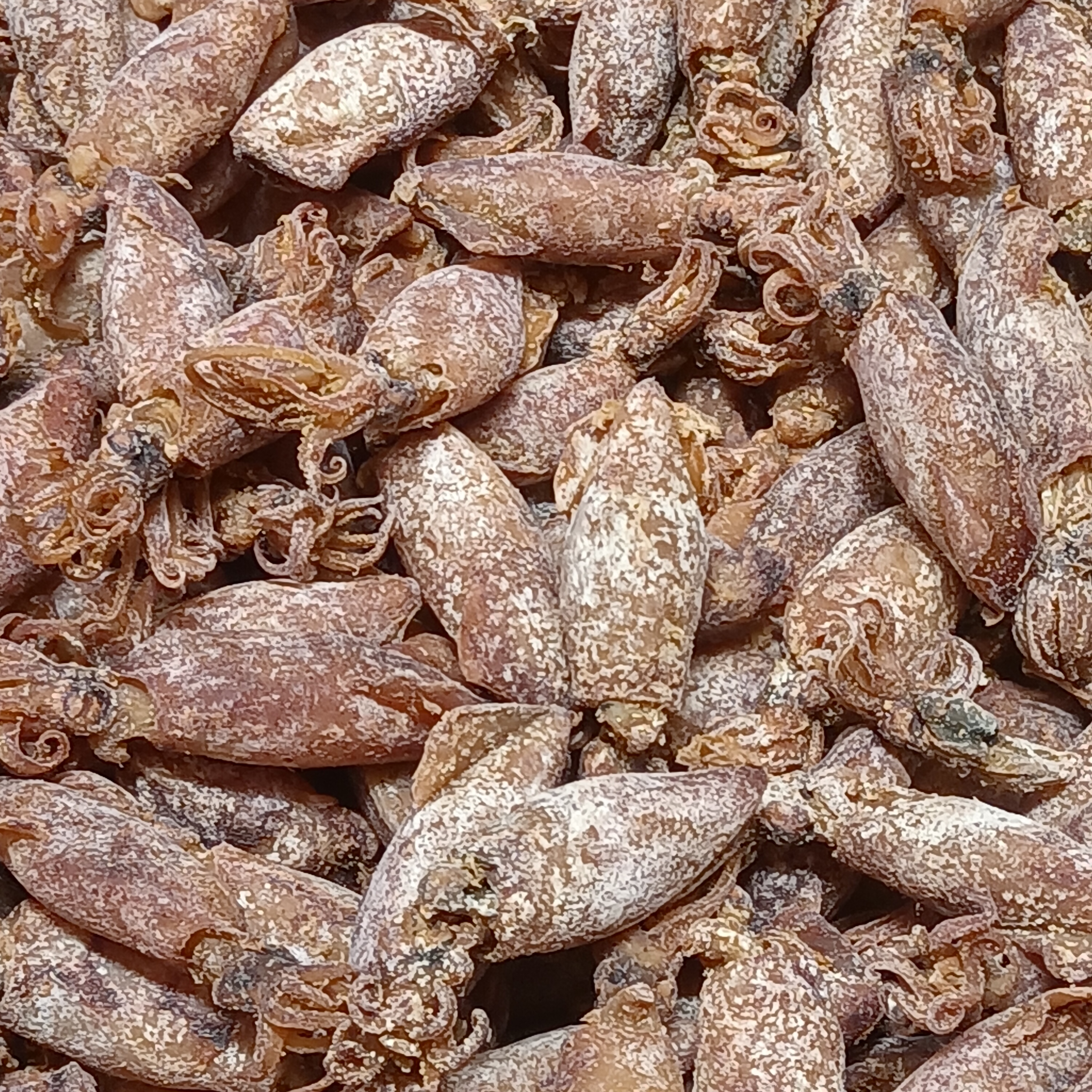
- Dried loliolus japonica

Conservation status
- Data Deficient (IUCN 3.1)

Scientific classification
- Kingdom: Animalia
- Phylum: Mollusca
- Class: Cephalopoda
- Order: Myopsida
- Family: Loliginidae
- Genus: Loliolus
- Species: L. japonica

Binomial name
- Loliolus japonica Hoyle, 1885

= Loliolus japonica =

Species of squid

Loliolus japonica, the Japanese squid, is a species of squid from the family Loliginidae. As the name suggests, it lives around Japan, but has also been found around Vietnam and China. They are pelagic, living 1–30 m (3 ft 3 in – 98 ft 5 in) down in the ocean.

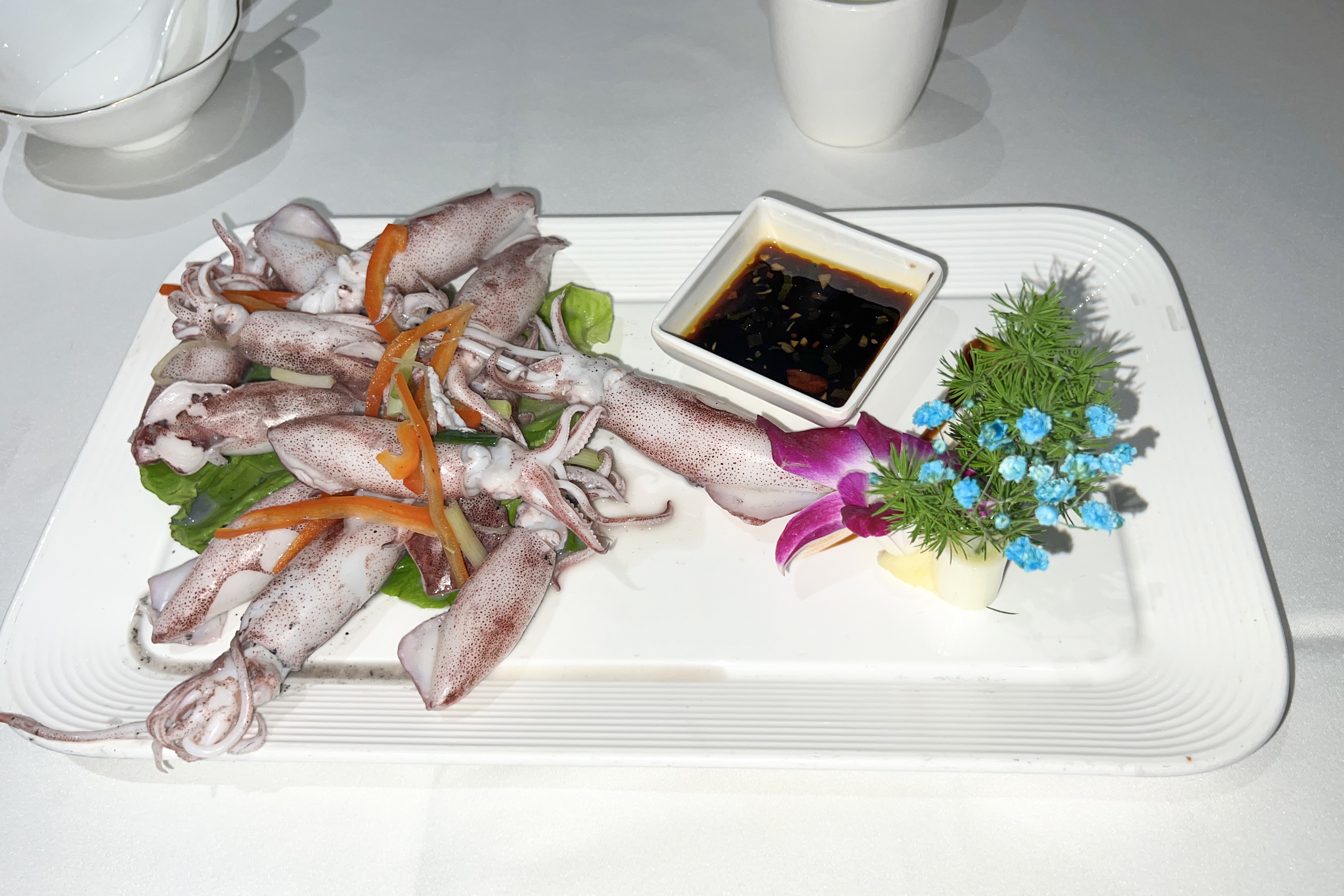
At a restaurant in Beijing, China

The Japanese squid has light tan skin, with speckles all over its mantle and tentacles. It has a particularly large mantle, and an unusually wide fin along the mantle as well. It has dark, black eyes. Females are larger than males. The maximum length a male can get is 12 centimeters. Loliolus japonica are nonbioluminescent species which means that they do not emit light.

A male will perform various rituals to get a female's attention, and after that they will mate. Embryos will hatch into a planktonic stage for a fair amount of time, but will then turn into adults. Males and females die after spawning.
