= Persicarin =

- Skeletal structure of persicarin

Names
- IUPAC name 4′,5,7-Trihydroxy-3′-methoxy-4-oxoflav-2-en-3-yl hydrogen sulfate
- Systematic IUPAC name 5,7-Dihydroxy-2-(4-hydroxy-3-methoxyphenyl)-4-oxo-4H-1-benzopyran-3-yl hydrogen sulfate
- Other names isohamnetin 3-monosulphate Isohamnetin 3-sulfate Isohamnetin 3-monosulfate Chromone, 2-(4-hydroxy-3-methoxyphenyl)-3,5,7-trihydroxy-, 3-sulfate (ester); 4H-1-Benzopyran-4-one, 5,7-dihydroxy-2-(4-hydroxy-3-methoxyphenyl)-3-(sulfooxy)-

Identifiers
CAS Number	549-31-5
3D model (JSmol)	Interactive image
ChEMBL	ChEMBL1207992
ChemSpider	4589518
PubChem CID	5487766
UNII	HUF6GW9HDB
CompTox Dashboard (EPA)	DTXSID40203391
- InChI: InChI=1S/C16H12O10S/c1-24-11-4-7(2-3-9(11)18)15-16(26-27(21,22)23)14(20)13-10(19)5-8(17)6-12(13)25-15/h2-6,17-19H,1H3,(H,21,22,23) Key: CZFNXFXZXWDYMZ-UHFFFAOYSA-N; InChI=1/C15H24/c1-11-6-5-7-12(2)13-10-15(3,4)14(13)9-8-11/h6,13-14H,2,5,7-10H2,1,3-4H3/b11-6+/t13-,14-/m1/s1 Key: NPNUFJAVOOONJE-GFUGXAQUBC
- SMILES: COC1=C(C=CC(=C1)C2=C(C(=O)C3=C(C=C(C=C3O2)O)O)OS(=O)(=O)O)O

Properties
Chemical formula	C_{16}H_{12}O_{10}S
Molar mass	396.32 g·mol^{−1}
Density	1.9±0.1 g/cm^{3}
Melting point	288 °C (550 °F; 561 K) decomposes
Solubility in water	Practically insoluble in water
Acidity (pK_{a})	-3.53
Refractive index (n_{D})	1.764

Hazards
- Occupational safety and health (OHS/OSH)
Main hazards	Toxic
- Except where otherwise noted, data are given for materials in their standard state (at 25 °C [77 °F], 100 kPa). Infobox references

Persicarin is a sulfated flavonoid naturally found in the cells of several plant species, including the water dropwort (Oenanthe javanica). It was first isolated from water pepper in 1937 by Jeffrey Harborne. The name of persicarin is derived from the Latin name of the plant: Persicaria hydropiper. It is also found in dill and because it is then excreted into urine, that makes persicarin a potential biomarker for the consumption of this food. Persicarin has been reported to show some promising results in protecting against and treating type 1 diabetes-induced liver inflammation and damage in mice models.

Persicarin is poorly soluble but is potentially a very strongly acidic substance based on its estimated pKa value.

The functional role played by persicarin in plant cells and tissues, and in fact the role of other sulfated flavonoids in general, is currently not clear. It has been theorised that sulfated flavonoids play a role in molecular recognition, stimulate plant hormone transport, detoxification and signalling pathways. Sulfated flavonoids seem to also have an important role in co-pigmentation by forming stable complexes with anthocyanin pigments, but the specific function of persicarin remains unknown.
