= Muneo =

- Gender: Male

Origin
- Origin: Japanese
- Meaning: Different meanings depending on the kanji used

Muneo (written: 宗男 or 宗雄) is a masculine Japanese given name. Notable people with the name include:

- Muneo Suzuki (鈴木 宗男) (born 1948), Japanese politician
- Tokunaga Muneo (徳永 宗雄), Japanese academic
- Muneo Yoshikawa (born 1938), Japanese academic and writer
