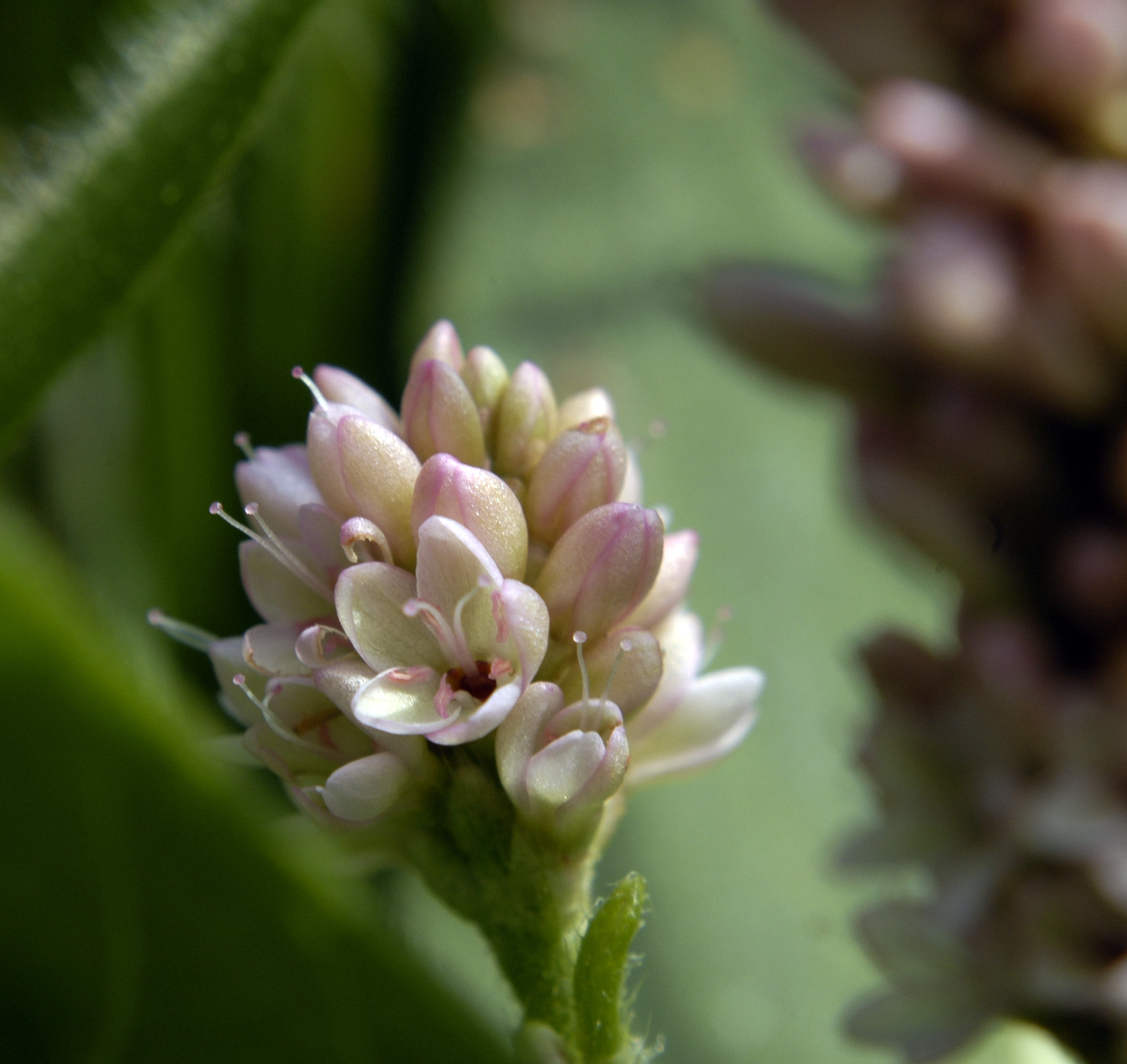

Conservation status
- Secure (NatureServe)

Scientific classification
- Kingdom: Plantae
- Clade: Tracheophytes
- Clade: Angiosperms
- Clade: Eudicots
- Order: Caryophyllales
- Family: Polygonaceae
- Genus: Persicaria
- Species: P. pensylvanica

Binomial name
- Persicaria pensylvanica (L.) M.Gómez

Synonyms
- Dioctis pensylvanica (L.) Raf.; Persicaria mississippiensis (Stanford) Small; Polygonum maculatum Raf.; Polygonum mississippiense Stanford; Polygonum pensylvanicum L.

= Persicaria pensylvanica =

Species of plant

Persicaria pensylvanica (syn. Polygonum pensylvanicum) is a species of flowering plant in the buckwheat family, Polygonaceae. It is native to parts of North America, where it is widespread in Canada and the United States. It has also been noted as an introduced species in parts of Europe and South America. Common names include Pennsylvania smartweed, pinkweed, and common smartweed.

== Description ==
Pennsylvania smartweed is a variable annual herb reaching 10 cm (3.9 in) to 2 m (6.6 ft) tall. The upright, ribbed stems are branching or unbranched. The lance-shaped leaves have a short petiole and a blade about 4–17 cm (1.6–6.7 in) long, sometimes up to 23 cm (9 in). The blade may be marked with a dark blotch. The brownish ochrea at the base is up to 2 cm (0.79 in). The inflorescences grow at the top of the stem and from the leaf axils. The flowers have five pinkish or greenish tepals each a few millimeters long.

This plant grows in moist, disturbed habitat types, such as ponds, reservoirs, riverbanks, irrigated fields, and ditches.

== Ecology ==
This plant is an important part of the habitat for waterfowl and other birds, which use it for food and cover. At least 50 species of birds have been observed feeding on the seeds, including ducks, geese, rails, bobwhites, mourning dove, and ring-necked pheasant. The seeds and other parts are eaten by mammals such as the white-footed mouse, muskrat, raccoon, and fox squirrel.

== Traditional native American medicine ==
Native Americans have various uses for the plant. The Chippewa use it for epilepsy. The Iroquois use it for horse colic. The Menominee take a leaf infusion for hemorrhage of blood from the mouth and post-partum healing. The Meskwaki use it on bleeding hemorrhoids.
