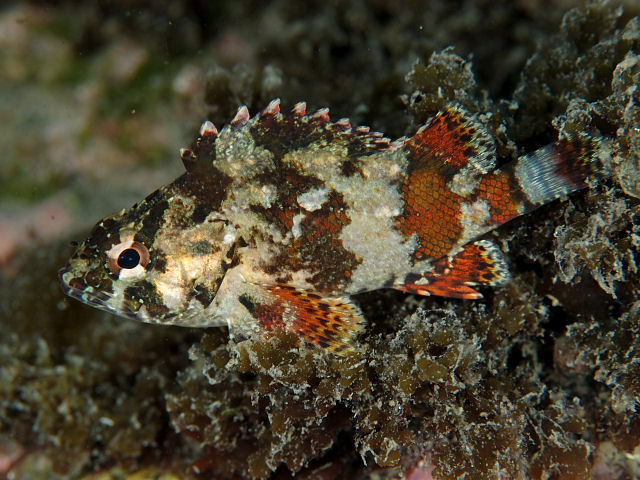

Scientific classification
- Kingdom: Animalia
- Phylum: Chordata
- Class: Actinopterygii
- Order: Perciformes
- Family: Scorpaenidae
- Genus: Sebastes
- Species: S. hubbsi

Binomial name
- Sebastes hubbsi (Matsubara, 1937)

Synonyms
- Sebastichthys hubbsi Matsubara, 1937

= Sebastes hubbsi =

Species of fish

Sebastes hubbsi is a species of marine ray-finned fish belonging to the subfamily Sebastinae, the rockfishes, part of the family Scorpaenidae. This species is found in the Northwest Pacific. It grows to 15.6 cm (6.1 in) standard length.

== Taxonomy ==
Sebastes hubbsi was first formally described in 1937 as Sebastichthys hubbsi by the Japanese ichthyologist Kiyomatsu Matsubara with the type locality given as Japan. Some authorities classify this species in the subgenus Pteropodus. The specific name honours the American ichthyologist Carl L. Hubbs, who pointed out that the name Matsubara originally gave this taxon in 1936, Sebastichthys brevispinis, was preoccupied by Tarleton Hoffman Bean’s S. proriger brevispinis, described in 1884.

== Description ==
Sebastes hubbsi It grows to a maximum standard length of 15.6 cm (6.1 in).

== Distribution and habitat ==
Sebastes hubbsi is found in the northwestern Pacific Ocean off the coasts of China, Japan and Korea. It is a demersal species.

== Biology ==
Senastes hubbsi is ovoviviparous and the females are fertilised internally and extrude larvae which have a notocord and are around 5.5 mm (0.22 in) in standard length, these begin to develop a caudal fin and fin rays at 7 mm (0.28 in) standard length and have become postlarval juveniles from 10–13 mm (0.39–0.51 in) standard length. The larvae and pelagic juveniles of this species were found close to shore and not in offshore habitats. The youngest larvae fed on small zooplankton while the older larvae and juveniles fed on calanoid copepods and the eggs of invertebrates. The rapid development of the larvae prevents offshore dispersal of this species. In Jiaozhou Bay, Qingdao breeding takes place from April to May.

== Culinary use ==
Sebastes hubbsi is known as ureok (우럭) in Korean cuisine and used in fish soup.

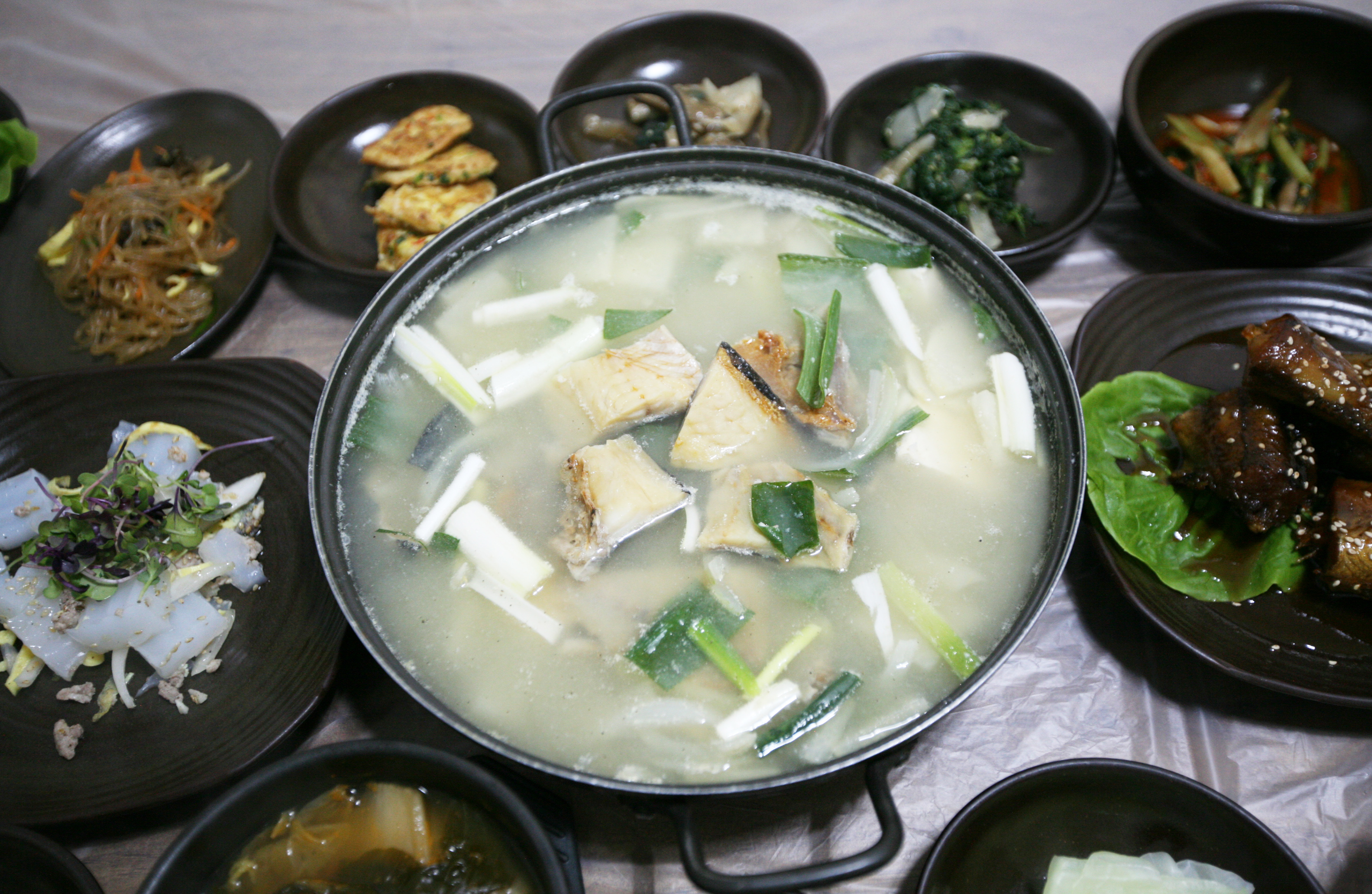
Ureok-jeot-guk (rockfish soup)
