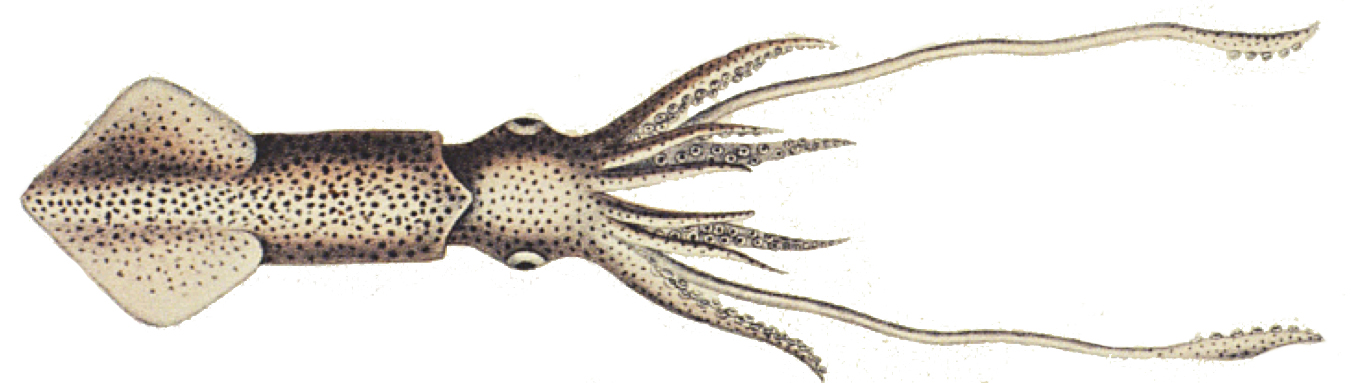
- Loliolus sumatrensis

Scientific classification
- Kingdom: Animalia
- Phylum: Mollusca
- Class: Cephalopoda
- Order: Myopsida
- Family: Loliginidae
- Genus: Loliolus; Steenstrup, 1856

Type species
- Loliolus typus Steenstrup, 1856

= Loliolus =

Genus of squids

Loliolus is a genus of squid from the family Loliginidae from the Indo-Pacific region. The genus is divided into two subgenera Loliolus and Nipponololigo. They are small squids of less than 150 mm (5.9 in) in mantle length which have an expanded tentacular club. This club has 4 series of suckers. The sucker rings have plate-like teeth which are square in shape all around them. The males' hectocotylus has a ventral crest which is created by the fusion of the protective membrane with the ventral series of papillae and this crest completely obscures the conical shape of the papillae. The mantle is rounded posteriorly and lacks the posterior tail-like lobe while the fins are positioned on the rear of the mantle and extend to the posterior tip of the mantle. Their eggs are small and the males' spermatophore has a short cement body. They do not possess photophores. The two subgenera are distinguished by the hectocotylus which in Loliolus encompasses the entire arm and there are no unmodified suckers while in Nipponololigo the arm is only partly hectocotylsed and has normal suckers at its base.

== Species ==
The following species are classified as belonging to Loliolus:

- Subgenus Loliolus (Loliolus) Steenstrup, 1856
  - Loliolus affinis Steenstrup, 1856 little Indian squid
  - Loliolus hardwickei (Gray, 1849) Steenstrup’s bay squid
- Subgenus Loliolus (Nipponololigo) Natsukari, 1983
  - Loliolus beka (Sasaki, 1929) Beka squid
  - Loliolus japonica (Hoyle, 1885) Japanese squid
  - Loliolus sumatrensis (d'Orbigny in Férussac & d'Orbigny], 1835) Kobi squid
  - Loliolus uyii (Wakiya & Ishikawa, 1921) little squid
