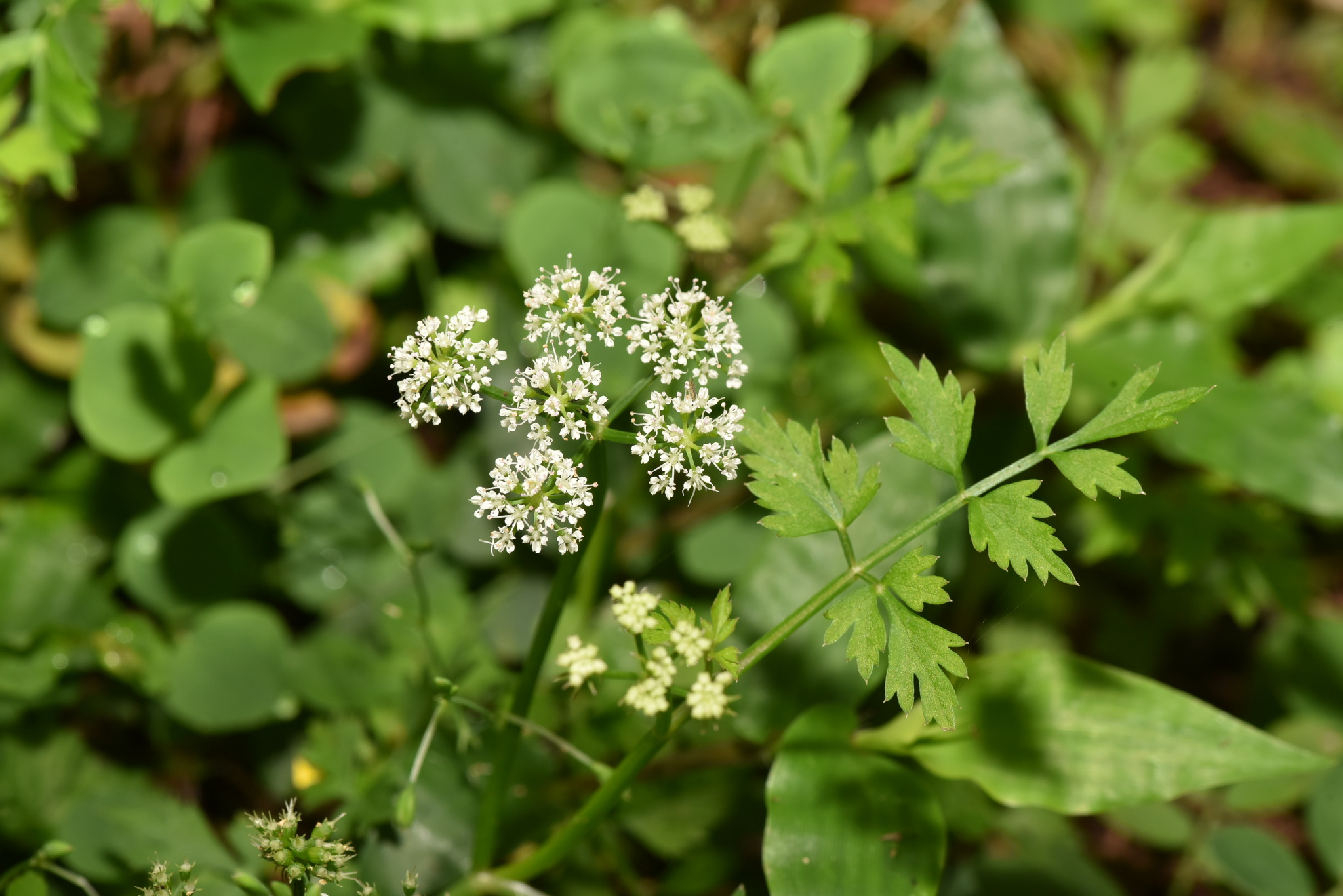

Conservation status
- Least Concern (IUCN 3.1)

Scientific classification
- Kingdom: Plantae
- Clade: Embryophytes
- Clade: Tracheophytes
- Clade: Spermatophytes
- Clade: Angiosperms
- Clade: Eudicots
- Clade: Asterids
- Order: Apiales
- Family: Apiaceae
- Genus: Oenanthe
- Species: O. javanica

Binomial name
- Oenanthe javanica (Blume) DC.

Synonyms
- Cyssopetalum javanicum Turcz.; Dasyloma corticatum Miq.; Dasyloma japonicum Miq.; Dasyloma javanicum (Blume) Miq.; Dasyloma laciniatum (Blume) Miq.; Dasyloma latifolium Lindl.; Dasyloma subbipinnatum Miq.; Falcaria javanica (Blume) DC.; Falcaria laciniata (Blume) DC.; Oenanthe decumbens Koso-Pol.; Oenanthe kudoi Suzuki & Yamam.; Oenanthe normanii F.P. Metcalf; Oenanthe stolonifera Wall. ex DC; Oenanthe subbipinnata (Miq.) Drude; Phellandrium stoloniferum Roxb.; Sium javanicum Blume

= Oenanthe javanica =

Species of plant

Oenanthe javanica, commonly Java waterdropwort, water celery, water dropwort, Chinese celery, Indian pennywort, minari and Japanese (flat leaf) parsley, is a plant of the genus Oenanthe originating from East Asia. It has a widespread native distribution in temperate Asia and tropical Asia, and is also native to Queensland, Australia.

This plant should not be confused with the plants of the genus Cryptotaenia, sometimes called "Japanese wild parsley" (mitsuba in Japanese), Apium graveolens var. secalinum which is also called "Chinese celery", or other plants called "water dropwort" and "water celery".

== Description ==
Oenanthe javanica is a perennial herb that grows to about 1 m in height, with fibrous roots that emerge from all nodes, and flowers with 5 white petals and 5 stamens. The leaves are aromatic, glabrous, and have a sheath covering the stem. The leaflets are divided into lobes and crinkled. The 'Flamingo' variety has colorful pink edges. The plant grows wild in moist areas, along streams and on the edges of ponds.

The plant is considered officially invasive in several states of the United States.

== Culinary use ==
While many other species of Oenanthe are extremely toxic, Oenanthe javanica is edible, and is cultivated in China, India, Japan, Korea, Indonesia, Malaysia, Thailand, Taiwan, and Vietnam, as well as in Italy, where its spring growths are relished as a vegetable.

=== India ===
Known locally as komprek (Meitei: ꯀꯣꯝꯄ꯭ꯔꯦꯛ), it is commonly consumed in the Northeast Indian state of Manipur, where it is one of the main ingredients in Manipuri eromba and singju.

=== Japan ===
Called seri (セリ) in Japanese, it is one of the ingredients of the symbolic dish, Nanakusa-gayu, consumed annually on January 7. Seri is so called because the vegetable tends to aggressively compete with other plants for nutrition and space, thus the name 'seri' (競り) meaning 'to compete'. It is grown in irrigated rice fields, and in areas with clear and abundant water sources.

Miyagi Prefecture leads Japan's domestic seri production, and within the prefecture, Natori accounts for approximately 80% of the harvest, of which it became known as Sendai seri (仙台せり). It is known for its crunchy texture, rich flavor and the umami taste of the roots, hence it became one of the meibutsus of the region. In March 2024, Sendai seri received Geographical Indication status from the Ministry of Agriculture, Forestry and Fisheries.

Seri season begins from September to June, and it comes in two varieties: the winter variety, called ne-seri (根せり; root seri) is the whole seri, with root attached, while the spring variety, called ha-seri (葉せり; leaf seri) uses young and tender shoots. The former variety ends in March, giving way to the latter variety in April.

A regional specialty of Sendai is seri-nabe (せり鍋), where whole seri are put into a soup stock alongside other ingredients in a hotpot. It is offered every winter and several restaurants have specialized themselves in this dish due to its rising popularity. Kiritanpo-nabe, another hotpot dish originating from Akita Prefecture, also uses seri as one of its ingredients.

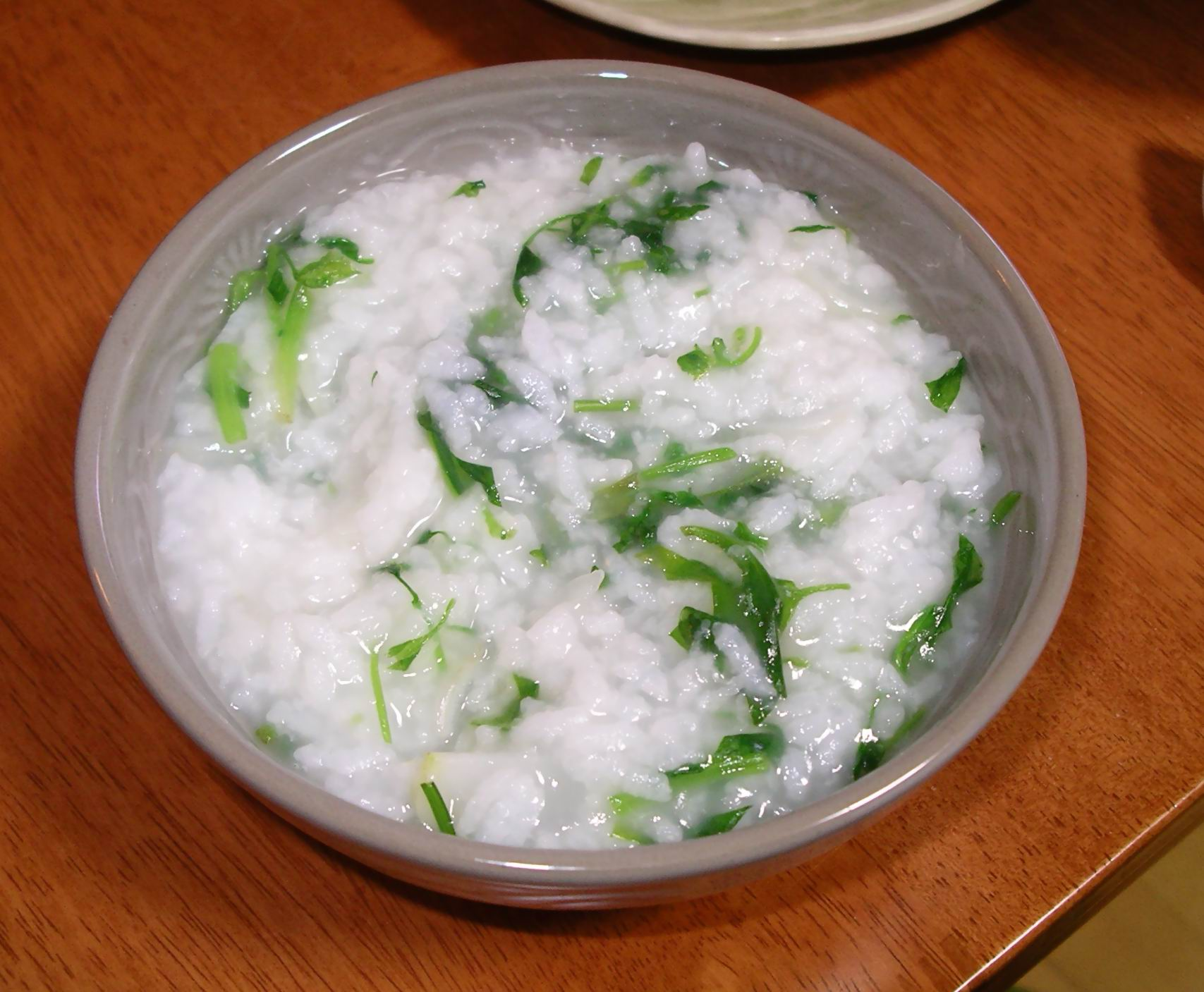
Nanakusa-gayu (seven herb congee) eaten on Nanakusa-no-sekku (seven herb festival)

=== Korea ===
In Korea, the plant is called minari (미나리) and is eaten as namul vegetable. The 2020 drama film Minari is named after the vegetable. Although minari is a native Korean word, it is represented by the hanja '芹' (geun) in ancient records as it carries the same meaning. Minari holds special value among the Joseon aristocracy because it is seen as a symbol of loyalty and humility; during King Sejong's reign, minari kimchi are placed on the second row of the table during ancestral rites. Additionally, it is also a symbol of learning, and the phrase chaegeun (채근; 采芹), which means 'harvesting minari', is used to describe studying at Sungkyungkwan. The vegetable was grown everywhere, from commoner households to the palace itself. Before the introduction and subsequent rise to popularity of cabbage in Korea during the late Joseon period, minari is the main ingredient of making kimchi alongside radish.

Minari-ganghoe is a seasonal food that is prepared every early April in anticipation of Buddha's Birthday, usually eaten with gochujang. There used to be a difference between the minari-ganghoe prepared by commoners and royalty; while the former is made in the shape of a topknot, the latter is made in the shape of a jokduri.

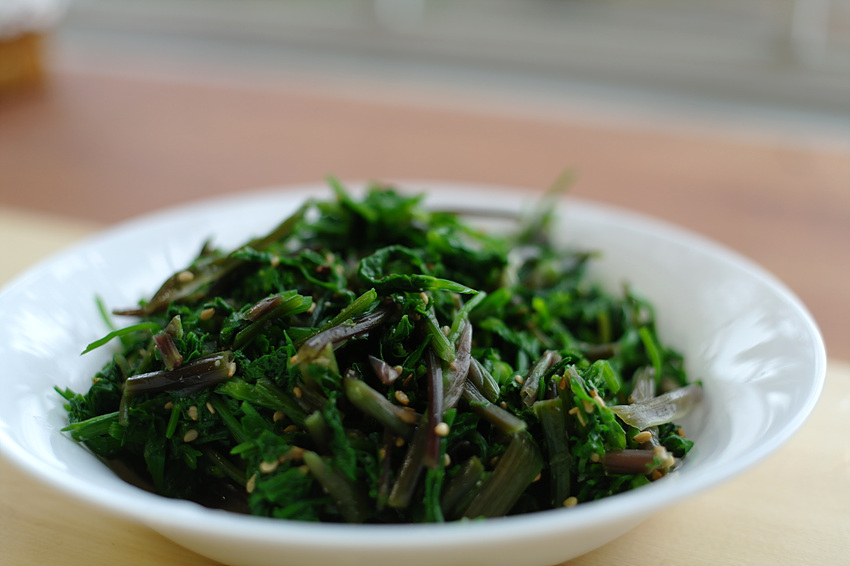
Minari-muchim (seasoned water dropwort salad)

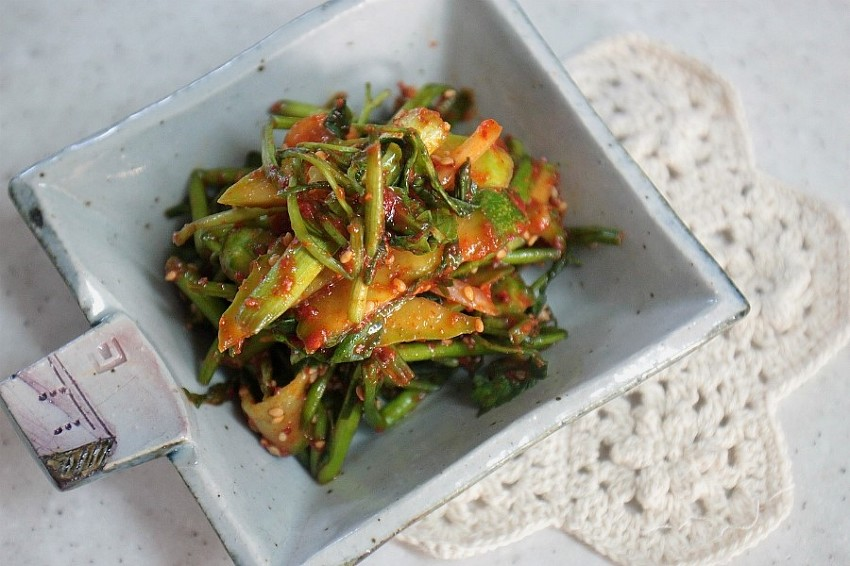
Minari-oi-muchim (seasoned water dropwart and cucumber salad)

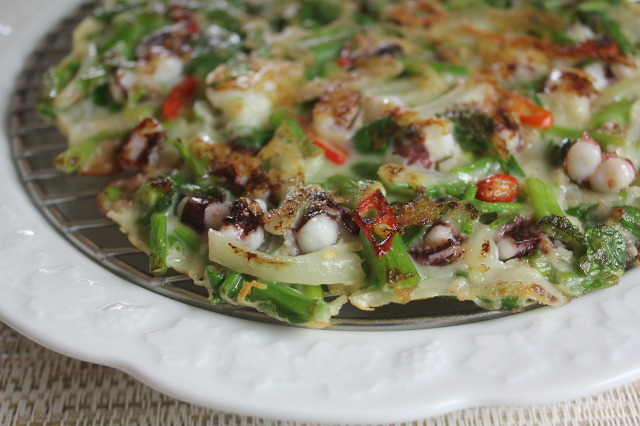
Minari-buchimgae (water dropwort pancake)

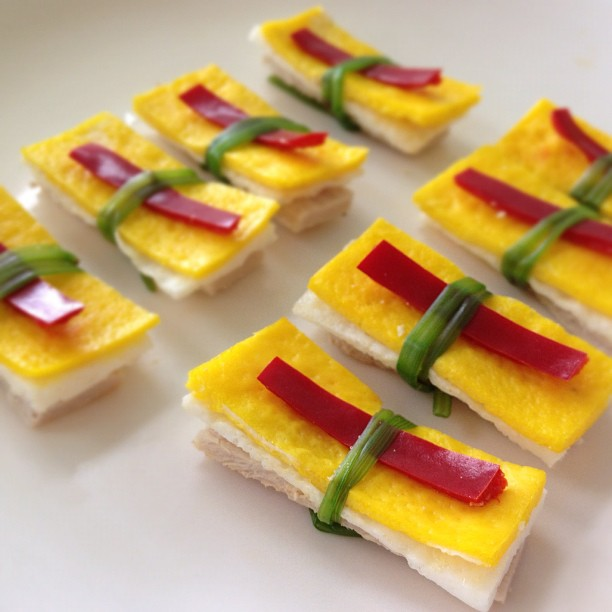
Minari-ganghoe (water dropwort rolls)

== Constituents ==
The plant contains persicarin and isorhamnetin.

== See also ==
- Nanakusa-no-sekku
