= Ochrea =

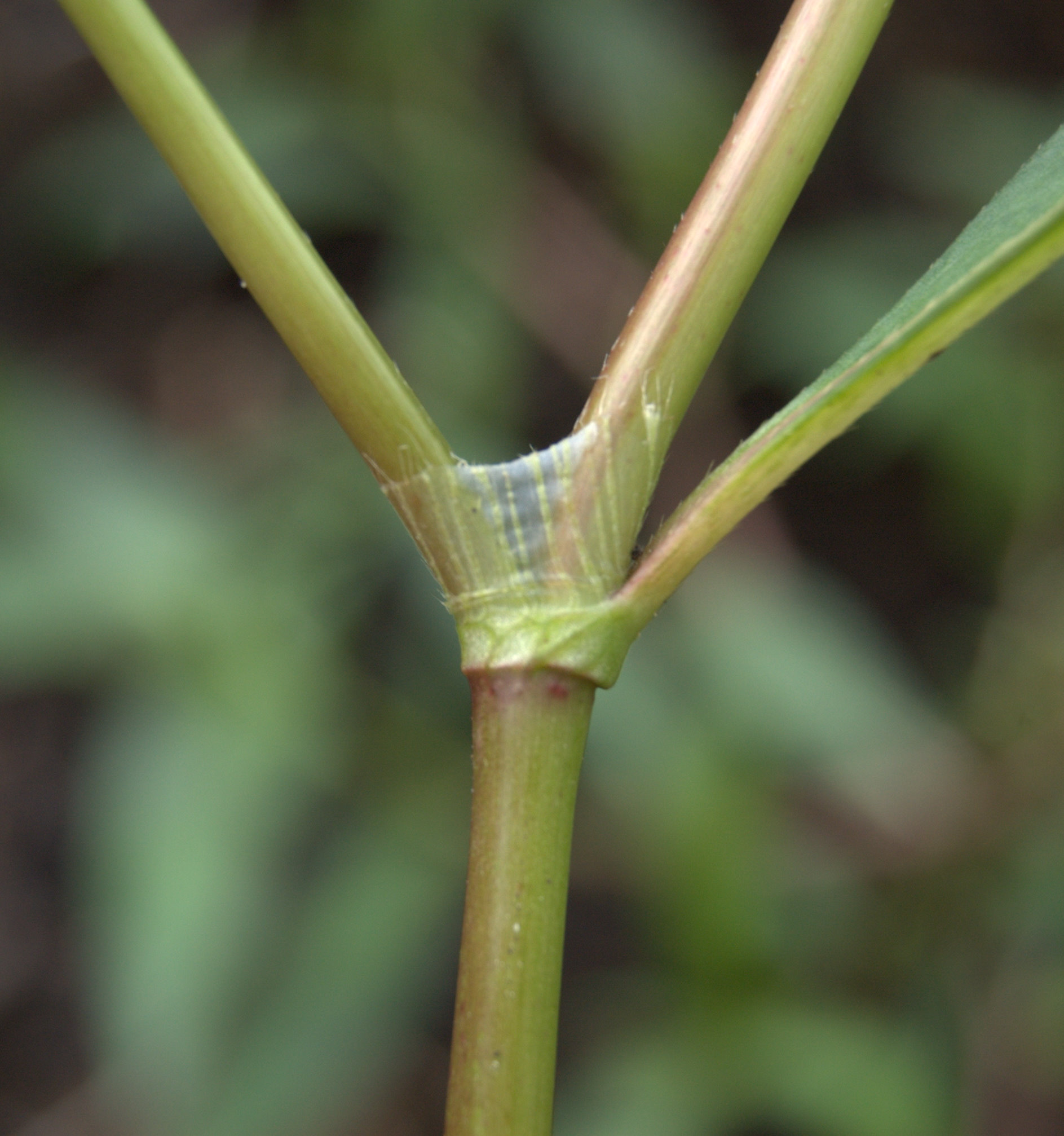
Ochrea on a redshank stem

An ochrea (Latin ocrea, greave or protective legging), also spelled ocrea, is a plant structure formed of stipules fused into a sheath surrounding the stem. It is typically found in the buckwheat family Polygonaceae and in some members of the orchid family Orchidaceae. In the palm family Arecaceae, it is an extension of the leaf sheath beyond the petiole insertion.
