= Hongeo =

Hongeo (홍어)is of Korean origin and refers to two aspects of skates:

- Hongeo-hoe 홍어회, a dish made from fermented skate
- Hongeo (fish), a monotypic genus containing only the Korean skate, Hongeo koreana
