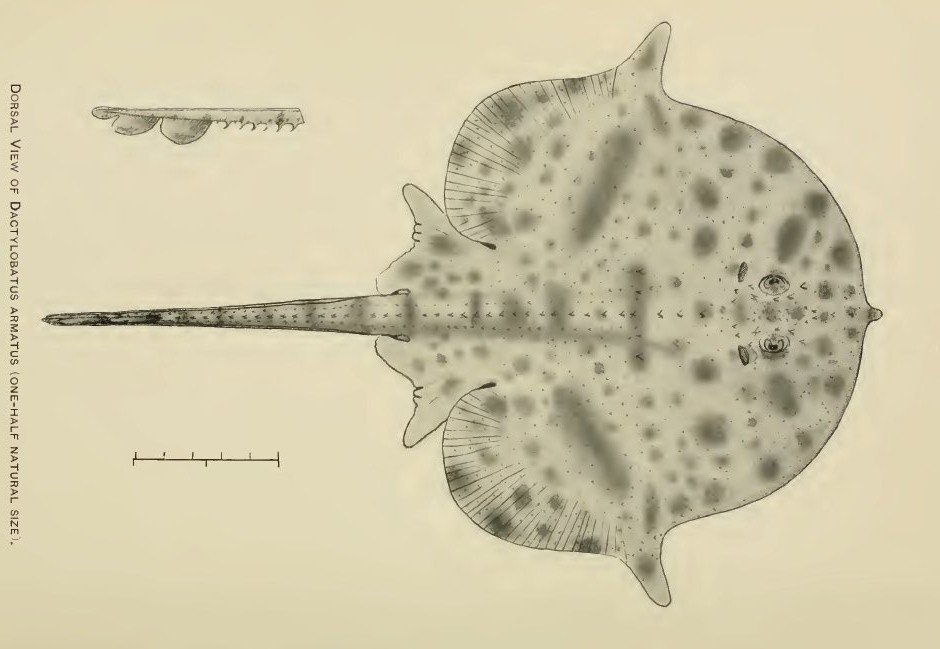

Conservation status
- Least Concern (IUCN 3.1)

Scientific classification
- Kingdom: Animalia
- Phylum: Chordata
- Class: Chondrichthyes
- Subclass: Elasmobranchii
- Order: Rajiformes
- Family: Rajidae
- Genus: Dactylobatus
- Species: D. armatus

Binomial name
- Dactylobatus armatus (B. A. Bean & A. C. Weed, 1909)

= Skillet skate =

Species of cartilaginous fish

The skillet skate (Dactylobatus armatus) is a small-bodied, deepwater skate in the family Rajidae.

== Distribution and habitat ==
The skillet skate is typically found at depths between 338 and 625 m (1,109 and 2,051 ft). Found in the western central Atlantic, its range extends from South Carolina to southern Florida, the northern Gulf of Mexico, and the Caribbean coasts of Nicaragua and northern South America.

== Description ==
The skillet skate is a small skate. Its total length is up to 32 cm. Its body is narrow and features a spatula-shaped lobe from the margin of each pectoral muscle. On the underside of the frontal disc, the skate displays characteristic spines.

== Relationship to humans ==
This species is assessed as least concern.
