= Okamejei meerdervoortii =

Bigeye skate

Conservation status
- Vulnerable (IUCN 3.1)

Scientific classification
- Kingdom: Animalia
- Phylum: Chordata
- Class: Chondrichthyes
- Subclass: Elasmobranchii
- Order: Rajiformes
- Family: Rajidae
- Genus: Okamejei
- Species: O. meerdervoortii

Binomial name
- Okamejei meerdervoortii Bleeker, 1860

Synonyms
- Raja macrophthalma; Raja meerdervoortii Bleeker, 1860

Ray species

The bigeye skate (Okamejei meerdervoortii) is a type of ray in the family Rajidae. The species is commonly found in the Western Pacific.

== Description ==
Bigeye skate grow to a maximum recorded length of 37 cm (15 in). They are found at depths of 70–90 m (230–300 ft).

== See also ==
"Okamejei meerdervoortii, Bigeye skate". www.fishbase.se.
