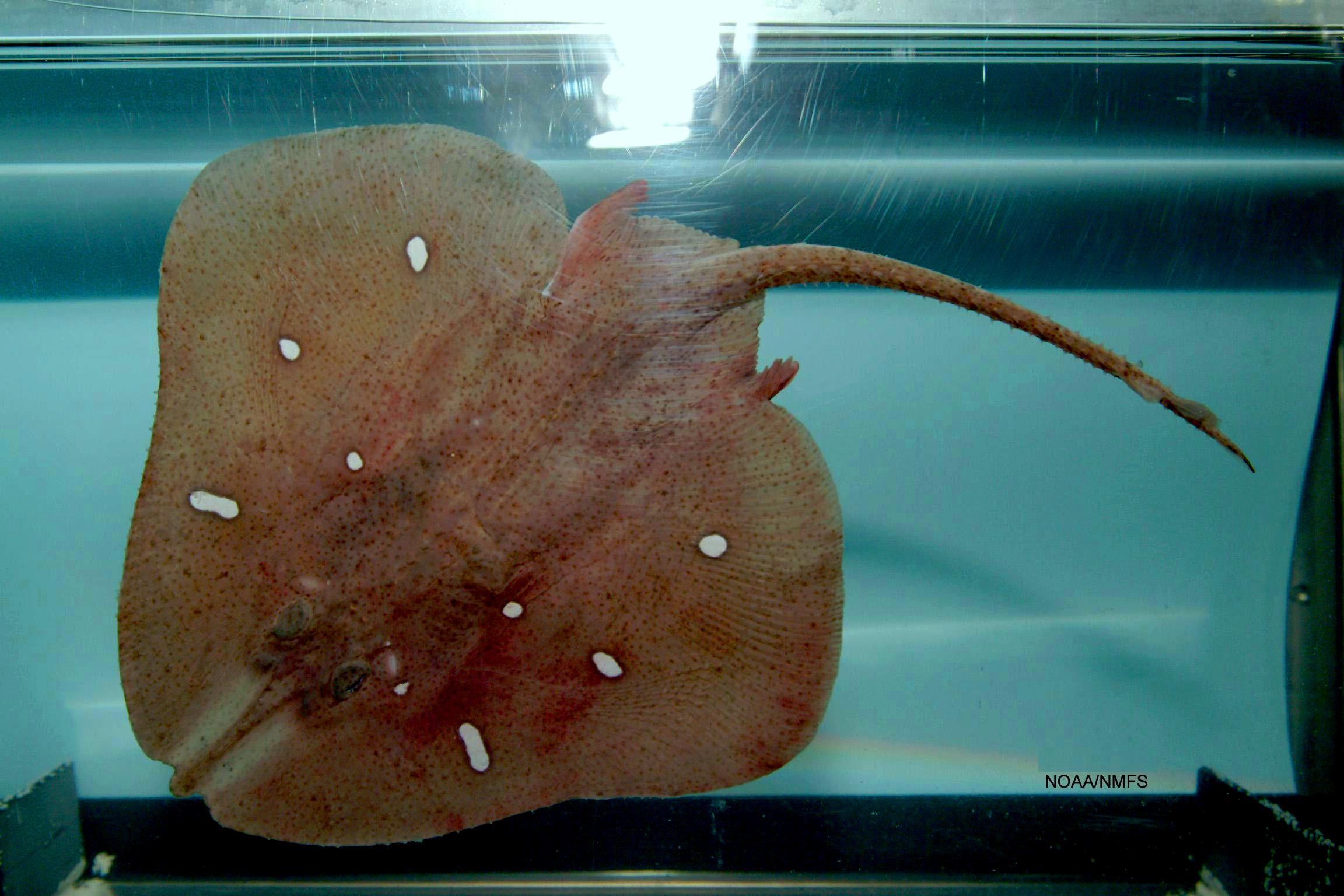

Conservation status
- Least Concern (IUCN 3.1)

Scientific classification
- Kingdom: Animalia
- Phylum: Chordata
- Class: Chondrichthyes
- Subclass: Elasmobranchii
- Order: Rajiformes
- Family: Rajidae
- Genus: Dactylobatus
- Species: D. clarkii

Binomial name
- Dactylobatus clarkii (Bigelow & Schroeder, 1958)

Synonyms
- Raja Clarki Bigelow & Schroeder, 1958; Raja Clarkii Bigelow & Schroeder, 1958

= Dactylobatus clarkii =

Species of cartilaginous fish

Dactylobatus clarkii, the hook skate or Clark's fingerskate, is a medium-sized (75 cm in length), but poorly known, deepwater skate." Its distribution is considered patchy and covers the western central and southwest Atlantic, including the east coast of Florida, throughout the Gulf of Mexico (Guatemala, Lesser Antilles, Colombia, Venezuela, and Suriname), and off Rio Grande do Sul (southern Brazil).

== Description ==
A 1967 survey of specimens included 14 males ranging from 228–668 mm (8.98–26.3 in), and eight females from 176–747 mm (6.93–29.4 in). It has been found on muddy bottoms of the continental slope at depths of 315–915 metres (1,030–3,000 ft).

Bigelow and Schroeder describe the species as "characterized among western Atlantic rajids by the presence of a band of formidable and very sharp thorns extending along the margin of the lower surface from the tip of the snout almost to the outer corners of the disc." The number of thorns in the median row varied from 30 to 43, without apparent relation to the size or age of the skate, while a triangular patch of thorns in the nuchal–scapular area ranged from one to five.

The upper surface is brown, with darker punctulations scattered across the disc, pelvic fins, and tail, and some specimens have conspicuous white spots, which if present, are located in the same parts of the disc.

Their eggs have horn-like projections on the shell.

== Diet ==
Stomach contents include one specimen of Mullus argentinae, remains of a teleost fish, and a predominance of Myctophidae fishes.

== Conservation status ==
The International Union for Conservation of Nature assessed the species' status as least concern.

== Media attention ==
A misidentified 427-cm-long hook skate was widely reported to be caught and released on November 23, 2013, near Miami Beach, but was later identified by George H. Burgess of the Florida Museum of Natural History as a roughtail stingray (Dasyatis centroura).
