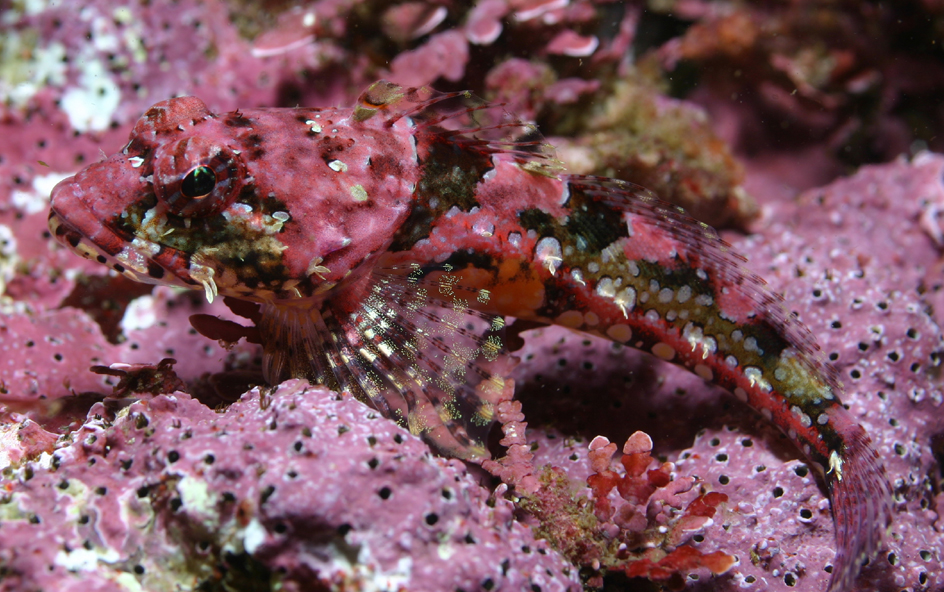
- Coralline sculpin (A. corallinus)
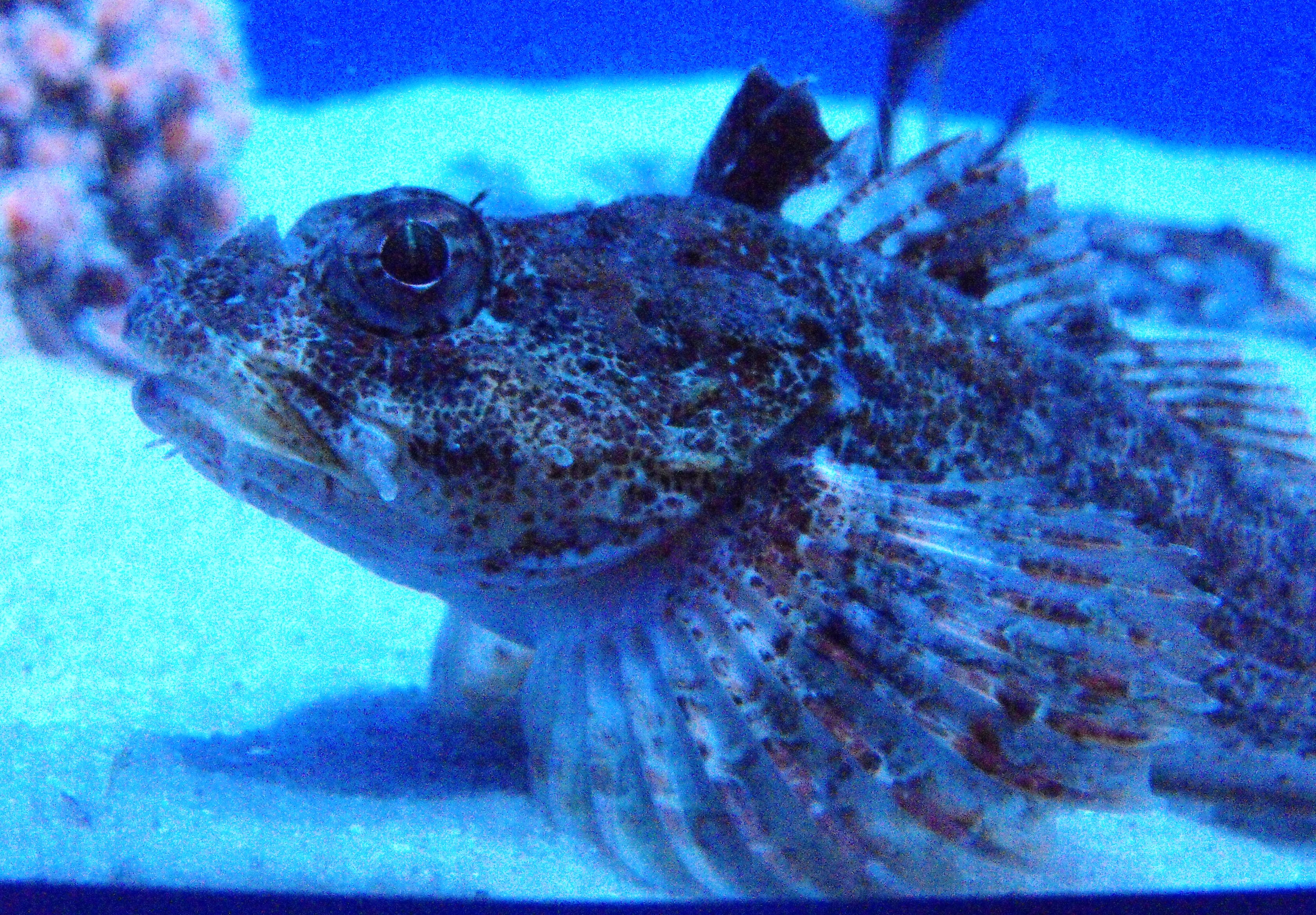
- Padded sculpin (A. fenestralis)

Scientific classification
- Kingdom: Animalia
- Phylum: Chordata
- Class: Actinopterygii
- Order: Perciformes
- Suborder: Cottoidei
- Family: Psychrolutidae
- Genus: Artedius (Girard, 1856)

Type species
- Scorpaenichthys lateralis Girard, 1854

Synonyms
- Allartedius C. L. Hubbs, 1926; Astrolytes Jordan & Starks, 1895; Axyrias Starks, 1896; Parartedius C. L. Hubbs, 1926; Parastrolytes C. L. Hubbs, 1926; Pterygiocottus B. A. Bean & Weed, 1920; Ruscariops C. L. Hubbs, 1926

= Artedius =

Genus of fishes

Artedius is a genus of marine ray-finned fishes belonging to the family Cottidae, the typical sculpins. These fishes are found in the northern Pacific Ocean.

== Taxonomy ==
Artedius was first proposed as a genus in 1854 by the French zoologist Charles Frédéric Girard with Scorpaenichthys lateralis, described by Girard from California in 1854, designated as its type species by Jordan and Evermann in 1896. The 5th edition of Fishes of the World classifies this genus in the subfamily Cottinae of the family Cottidae but other authorities classify it in the subfamily Oligocottinae of the family Psychrolutidae.

== Etymology ==
Artedius suffixes ius, meaning "belonging to" Artedi; Girard did not explain who this was honouring but it is almost certain that it is Peter Artedi, the "father of ichthyology".

== Species ==
There are currently five recognized species in this genus:

- Artedius corallinus (C. L. Hubbs, 1926) (coralline sculpin)
- Artedius fenestralis D. S. Jordan & C. H. Gilbert, 1883 (padded sculpin)
- Artedius harringtoni (Starks, 1896) (scalyhead sculpin)
- Artedius lateralis (Girard, 1854) (smoothhead sculpin)
- Artedius notospilotus Girard, 1856 (bonehead sculpin)

== Characteristics ==
Artedius sculpins are similar to many other cottid genera. They share the following identifying characteristics. They do not possess any postcleithra in the pelvic girdle, they have two or three parallel scale rows in the axilla of the pectoral fins with no cirrhi above these. There is a triangular extension of the pterotic bone which extends onto the edge of the cranium, The chin are dark in colour broken by paler circular blotches and the dark flanks are broken by colourless circular blotches too. The largest species is the bonehead sculpin (A. notospilotus) which has a maximum published total length of 25 cm (9.8 in) while the smallest is the scalyhead sculpin (Artedius harringtoni) which has a maximum published total length of 10 cm (3.9 in).

== Distribution ==
Artedius sculpins are found in the eastern North Pacific Ocean from the Komandorski Islands, Russia, south along the Pacific coast of North America to northern Baja California in Mexico.
