= Hongeo muchim =

Korean fermented fish dish

Hongeo muchin
- Associated cuisine: Korean cuisine
- Main ingredients: Skate

Korean name
- Hangul: 홍어무침
- RR: hongeo muchim
- MR: hongŏ much'im

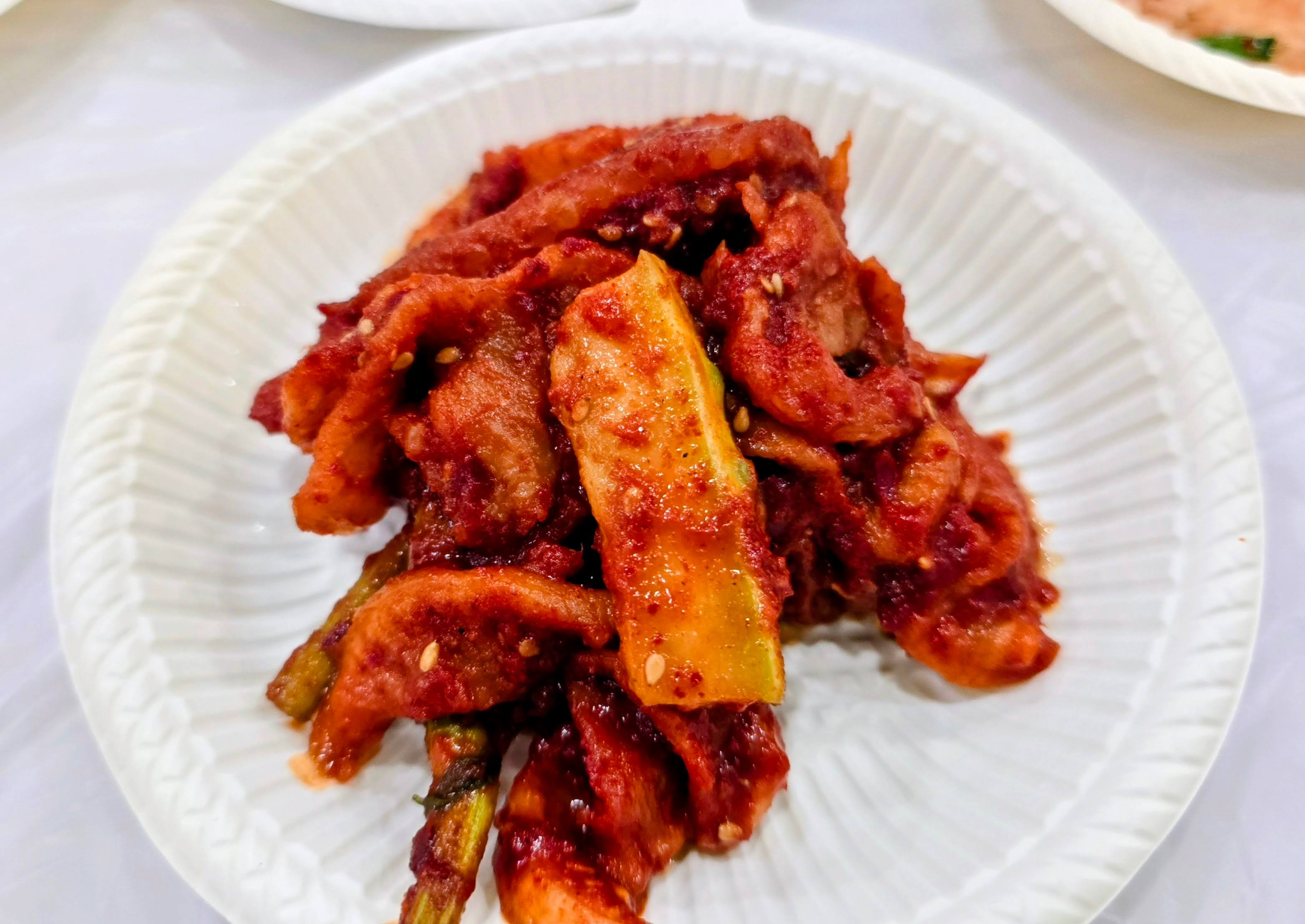
A typical Hongeo muchim served at Korean funerals

Hongeo muchim (Korean: 홍어무침; lit. 'skate mixed dish') is a spicy chilled salad in Korean cuisine made primarily from fermented skate (hongeo) and various mixed vegetables, dressed in a pungent, spicy, and sour gochujang (Korean chili paste) sauce. It is a variant of Korean hoe-muchim (raw fish salad) and is a specialty of Korea's Jeolla Province region.

== Significance ==
Hongeo muchim holds a significant place in the regional cuisine of Jeolla Province, often served as a main dish or a strong banchan. In parts of the Jeolla and Chungcheong regions, hongeo muchim is traditionally served at certain funeral meals alongside dishes such as yukgaejang; local sources describe this practice as customary in some communities. Vendors in urban food markets commonly sell hongeo muchim, which indicates the dish’s circulation beyond its regional origins.

Unlike hongeo-hoe (fermented raw skate), which is simply sliced and consumed with dipping sauces, hongeo muchim is a mixed dish where the skate is tossed with a variety of fresh ingredients and a complex dressing.

The dish has a distinctive ammonia-like aroma attributed in sources to compounds produced during the skate's fermentation; reactions to this aroma vary among consumers. The aroma is a characteristic feature of fermented skate and affects its reception outside regions where it is commonly consumed.

Some vendors use ray (ganjaemi) as a substitute for skate for cost or availability considerations.

== Preparation ==
The main ingredients of Hongeo muchim include:

- Skate (hongeo): Raw or lightly fermented skate fish slices are used. Some prefer to use less-fermented skate, making the muchim a milder, more approachable dish compared to highly fermented Hongeo-hoe.
- Spicy dressing (yangnyeomjang): A sauce based on gochujang, vinegar, garlic, ginger, soy sauce, and a sweetener such as sugar or rice syrup.
- Fresh vegetables: Commonly includes julienned Korean radish (mu or muchae), cucumber, and onion, which provide a crisp, fresh contrast.
- Aromatics: Korean parsley (minari) is a popular aromatic addition, and sesame oil and sesame seeds are used for garnish.

The skate is typically marinated in an acidic mixture, such as vinegar or makgeolli (Korean rice wine), a step described in recipe sources as intended to soften the texture of the flesh and bones.

The dish serves as a key ingredient for naengmyeon (cold noodles) in some areas. In the Seoul and Gyeonggi regions, hoe naengmyeon (raw fish cold noodles) typically refers to a spicy mixed noodle dish topped with hongeo muchim. Conversely, in the coastal areas of Gangwon Province, hoe naengmyeon is more often topped with dried pollock (bukeo or hwangtae) muchim instead.

== See also ==
- Hongeo-hoe
- Gochujang
- Korean cuisine
