= Okamejei panayensis =

Conservation status
- Data Deficient (IUCN 3.1)

Scientific classification
- Kingdom: Animalia
- Phylum: Chordata
- Class: Chondrichthyes
- Subclass: Elasmobranchii
- Order: Rajiformes
- Family: Rajidae
- Genus: Okamejei
- Species: O. panayensis

Binomial name
- Okamejei panayensis Misawa, Babaran & Motomura 2022

Species of fish

Okamejei panayensis is a demersal fish belonging to the skate family, occurring in nearshore temperate environments and deep-water tropical and boreal regions.

== Habitat ==
Okamejei panayensis has been found in the waters off the South China Sea near Iloila, Philippines, close to the Philippine Rise. This area is on a continental ridge, with muddy sediment, inland bays and wide tidal flats where other Rajidae species are known to reside and spawn.

== Physical description ==
Like all skates, O. panayensis has a depressiform, cartilaginous, rhombic body that allows it to move closely along the seafloor. It has a mouth on the ventral side and a set of spiracles behind its eyes. It has ventral sensory pores (similar to ampullae in other forms of Chondrichthyes), with a lack of pores on the central abdominal region and pelvic lobes.

The ventral surface of the disk is broadly white, with a pale brown margin, and it is darkly pigmented at the bases of the pectoral fins and the nasal curtain. One distinguishable characteristic of the species is its densely scattered black spots on the dorsal disc, that do not come together to form patches. This feature alongside a yellowish-brown dorsal surface helps to visually differentiate it from O. hollandi and O. mengae, which are otherwise similar in appearance.

Okamejei panayensis has the least amount of pectoral fin radials of any organism in its genus, tallying in at 75 to 76 radials, and the second smallest preorbital snout length, which measures 14.3% of the total body length.

== Diet ==
Pelagic food sources such as squid, krill, shrimp, crustaceans, shelled mollusks, and other benthic invertebrates are typically eaten by demersal elasmobranchs like O. panayensis, indicating that this species likely has an equivalent diet.

== Conservation status ==
The size of the O. panayensis population is unknown. However, most Rajidae species are susceptible to overfishing due to their low reproductive rate and a direct relationship between stock size and recruitment.
