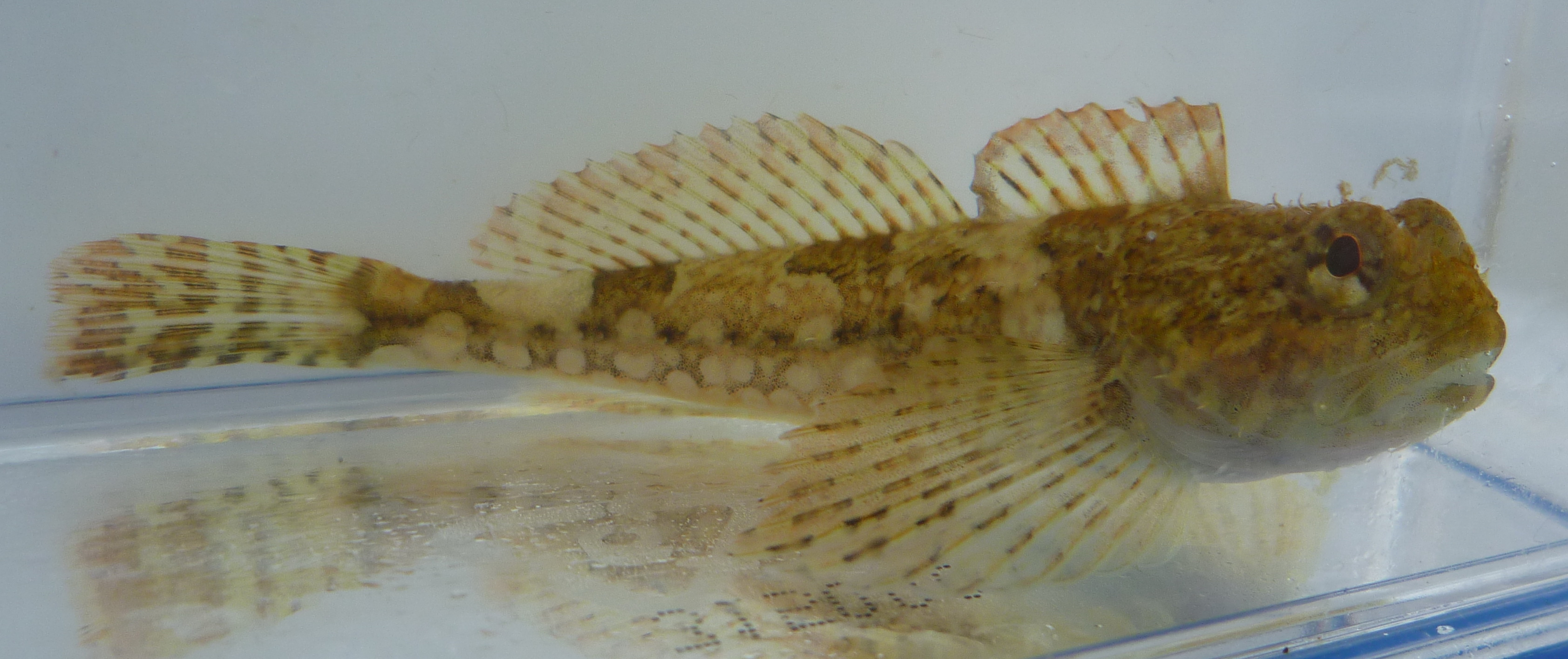

Scientific classification
- Kingdom: Animalia
- Phylum: Chordata
- Class: Actinopterygii
- Division: Teleostei
- Order: Perciformes
- Suborder: Cottoidei
- Family: Psychrolutidae
- Genus: Artedius
- Species: A. harringtoni

Binomial name
- Artedius harringtoni (Starks, 1896)

Synonyms
- Axyrias harringtoni Starks, 1896; Pterygiocottus macouni B. A. Bean & Weed, 1920

= Artedius harringtoni =

Species of fish

Artedius harringtoni, also known as the scalyhead sculpin or plumose sculpin, is a demersal species of marine ray-finned fish belonging to the family Cottidae, the typical sculpins. The species is native to the eastern Pacific Ocean.

== Etymology ==
The genus Artedius is named after Peter Artedi, a naturalist, and A. harringtoni is named after Mark W. Harrington, president of the University of Washington from 1895 to 1897.

== Description ==
Artedius harringtoni uses camouflage to blend into its surroundings. It can be identified by the orange linings of its gills and the orange or red lines running through its eyes. The species also has cirri above each eye. A. harringtoni is sexually dimorphic, with adult males reaching a maximum length of 10 centimeters.

== Range and habitat ==
Artedius harringtoni is native to the eastern Pacific along the West Coast of the United States and the British Columbia Coast, with a range extending from Kodiak Island, Alaska, to San Miguel Island, California. The species is found in intertidal and sub-tidal rocky bottoms, commonly around pilings, to a depth of 21 meters.

== Reproduction and behavior ==
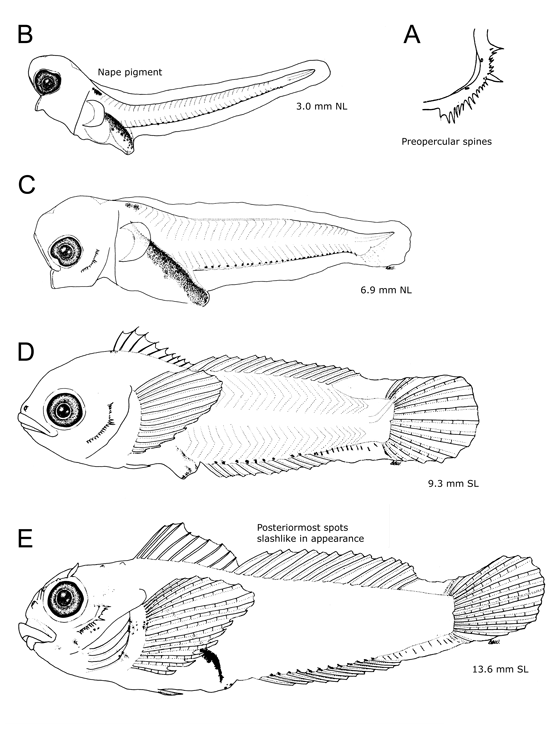
The stages of development of A. harringtoni

The species reproduces through internal fertilization, with the males guarding the eggs until hatching. Males are highly territorial.

== Diet and feeding ==
Artedius harringtoni is a forager and predator. It has been known to eat the eggs of the lingcod (Ophiodon elongates).

== Parasites ==
The species is host to two species of parasitic copepods, Haemobaphes intermedius and Clavella parva, a species of cestodes, (Bothriocephalus scorpii), a species of digenean, (Stephanostomum casum), and two species of nematodes (Ascarophis sebastodis and Contracaecum spiculigerum).

== See also ==
- Paternal care
