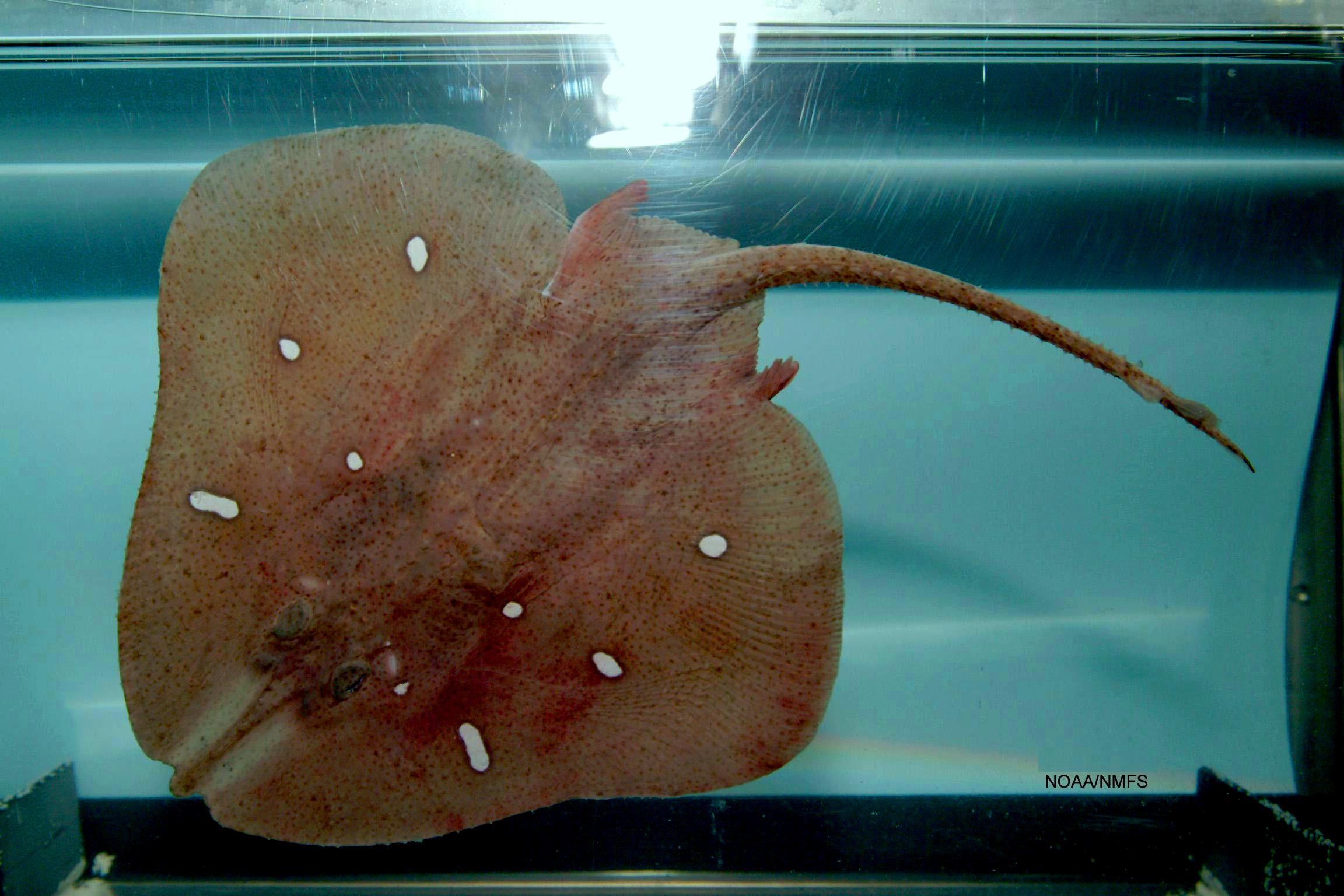
- Dactylobatus clarkii

Scientific classification
- Kingdom: Animalia
- Phylum: Chordata
- Class: Chondrichthyes
- Subclass: Elasmobranchii
- Order: Rajiformes
- Family: Rajidae
- Genus: Dactylobatus; B. A. Bean & A. C. Weed, 1909

Type species
- Dactylobatus armatus B. A. Bean & A. C. Weed, 1909

= Dactylobatus =

Genus of cartilaginous fishes

Dactylobatus is a genus of skates in the family Rajidae. They are found in deep waters in the western Atlantic Ocean from Brazil to the United States, including the Gulf of Mexico.

== Species ==
Two species are recognized in this genus:

- Dactylobatus armatus B. A. Bean & A. C. Weed, 1909 (skillet skate)
- Dactylobatus clarkii (Bigelow & Schroeder, 1958) (hook skate)
