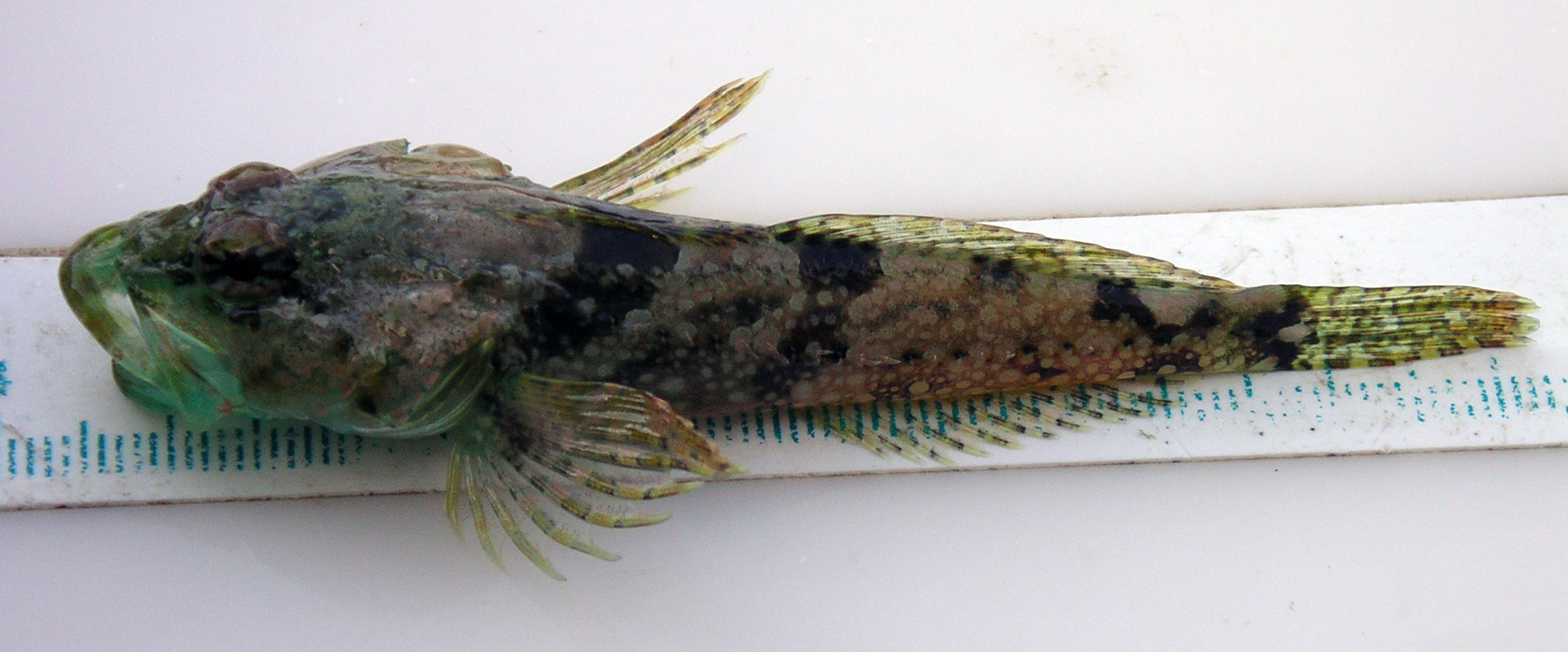
- Juvenile A. lateralis

Scientific classification
- Kingdom: Animalia
- Phylum: Chordata
- Class: Actinopterygii
- Order: Perciformes
- Suborder: Cottoidei
- Family: Psychrolutidae
- Genus: Artedius
- Species: A. lateralis

Binomial name
- Artedius lateralis (Girard, 1854)

Synonyms
- Scorpaenichthys lateralis Girard, 1854; Artedius delacyi C. L. Hubbs & Schultz, 1941

= Artedius lateralis =

Species of fish

Artedius lateralis, also known as the smoothhead sculpin or round-nosed sculpin, is a species of marine ray-finned fish belonging to the family Cottidae, the typical sculpins. The species, commonly found in the intertidal zone and to depths of 43 feet, is native to the northern Pacific, from Russia and the Bering Sea to Baja California. Growing to a length of 14 centimeters, it takes its name from the lack of scales on its head.
