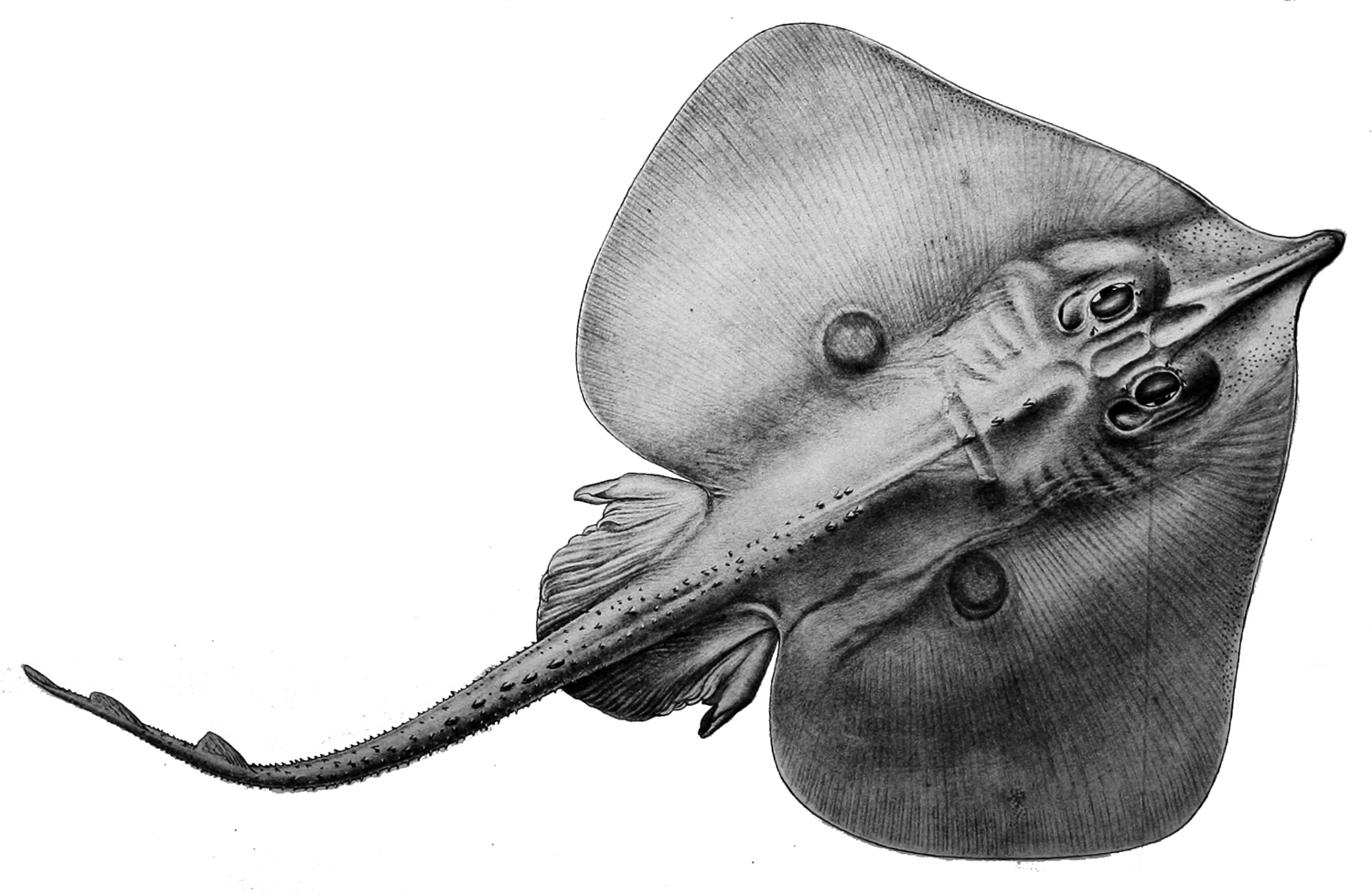
- Orbiraja powelli

Scientific classification
- Kingdom: Animalia
- Phylum: Chordata
- Class: Chondrichthyes
- Subclass: Elasmobranchii
- Order: Rajiformes
- Family: Rajidae
- Genus: Orbiraja; Last, Weigmann & Dumale, 2016

Type species
- Orbiraja jensenae Last & Lim, 2010

= Orbiraja =

Genus of cartilaginous fishes

Orbiraja is a genus of small skates in the family Rajidae from the western and central Indo-Pacific. Prior to 2016, they were included in the genus Okamejei.

== Species ==
There are three species in the genus:

- Orbiraja jensenae (Last & A. P. K. Lim, 2010) (Sulu Sea skate)
- Orbiraja philipi (Lloyd, 1906)
- Orbiraja powelli (Alcock, 1898) (Indian ringed skate)
