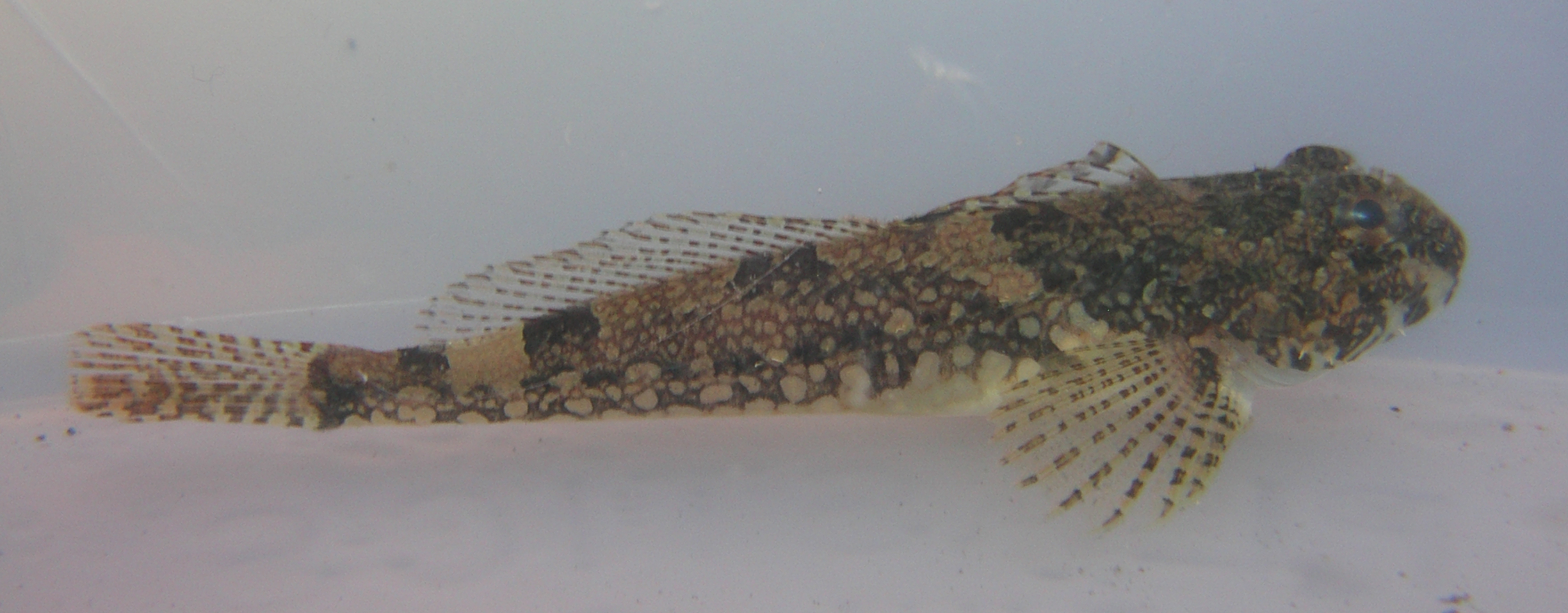

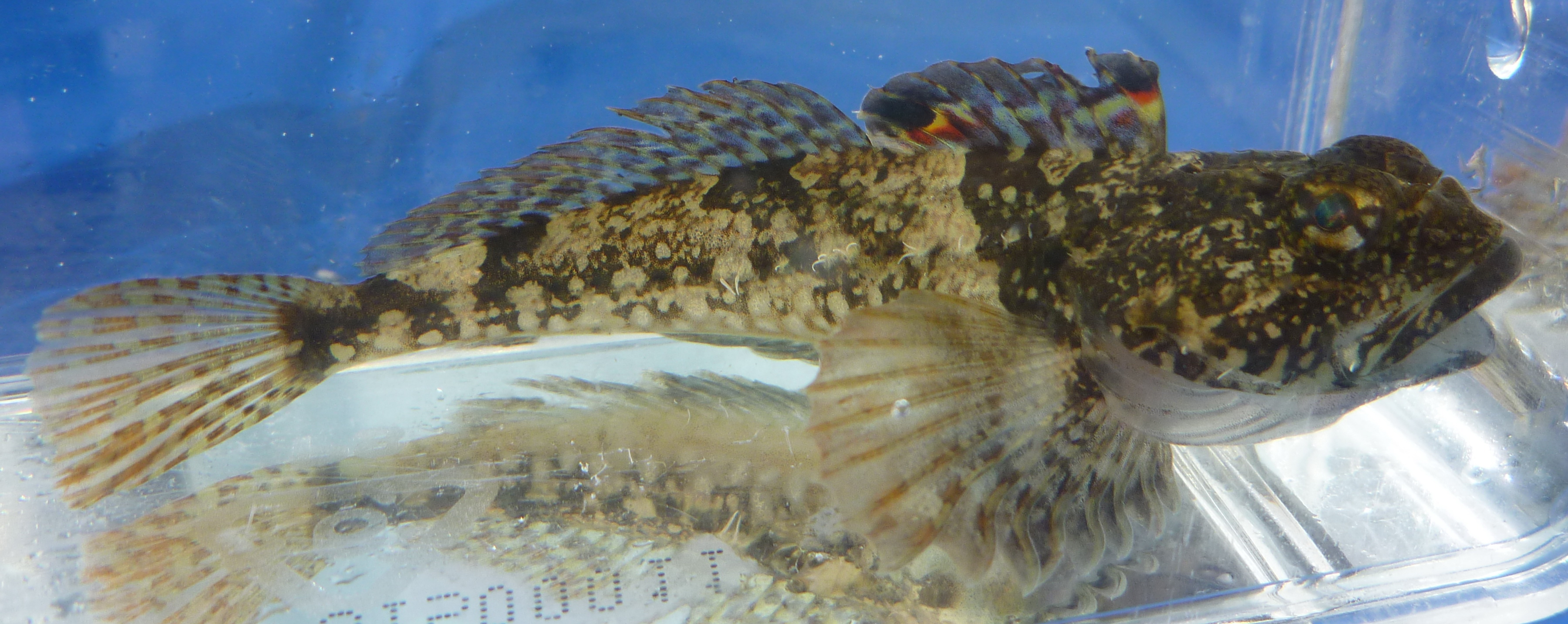

Scientific classification
- Kingdom: Animalia
- Phylum: Chordata
- Class: Actinopterygii
- Division: Teleostei
- Order: Perciformes
- Suborder: Cottoidei
- Family: Psychrolutidae
- Genus: Artedius
- Species: A. fenestralis

Binomial name
- Artedius fenestralis D. S. Jordan & C. H. Gilbert, 1883

Synonyms
- Astrolytes fenestralis (D. S. Jordan & Gilbert, 1883)

= Artedius fenestralis =

Species of fish

Artedius fenestralis, the padded sculpin, is a species of marine ray-finned fish belonging to the family Cottidae, the typical sculpins. The species is native to the eastern Pacific Ocean, with a range extending from the Alaska Peninsula to Southern California. It grows to a maximum length of 14 centimeters and subsists on a diet of shrimp and small fishes.
