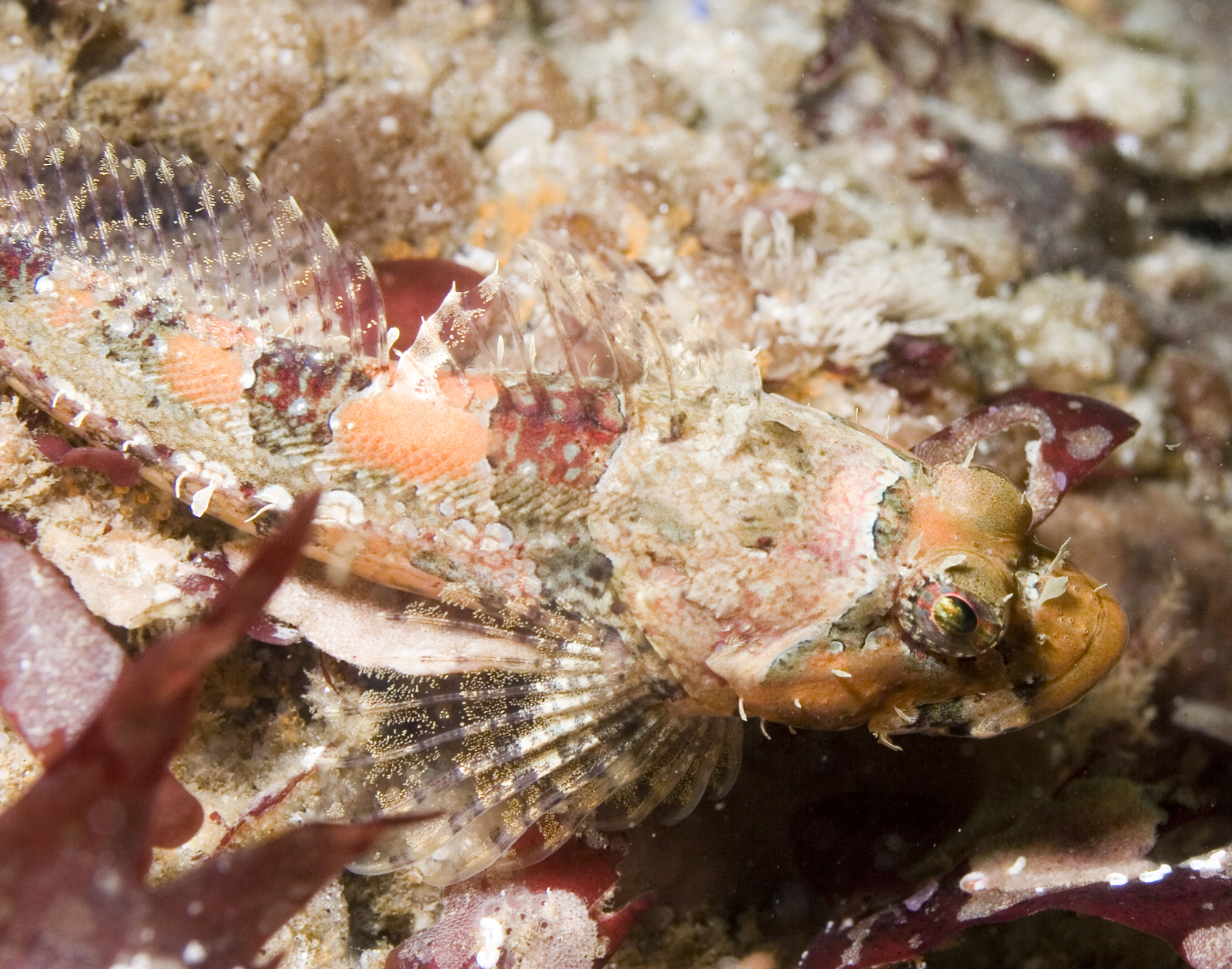

Scientific classification
- Kingdom: Animalia
- Phylum: Chordata
- Class: Actinopterygii
- Order: Perciformes
- Suborder: Cottoidei
- Family: Psychrolutidae
- Genus: Artedius
- Species: A. corallinus

Binomial name
- Artedius corallinus (C. L. Hubbs, 1926)

Synonyms
- Allartedius corallinus Hubbs, 1926

= Artedius corallinus =

Coralline sculpin

Species of fish

Artedius corallinus, the coralline sculpin, is a species of marine ray-finned fish belonging to the family Cottidae, the typical sculpins. It is found in the eastern North Pacific along the coasts of the western United States and Baja California.

== Taxonomy ==
Artedius corallinus was first formally described as Allartedius corallinus in 1926 by the American ichthyologist Carl Leavitt Hubbs with its type locality given as California. The specific name corallinus means "pertaining to coral", probably referring to this species association with coralline algae and it's camouflaged color and pattern.

== Description ==
Artedius corallinus has a large wide flattened head with a mouth reaching the rear edge of its large eyes. The colour is dark gray to rufous on the upper body and head with a pair of clear white bands on the head with a reddish-brown band between them and an obvious white spot at the base of the caudal peduncle. The non paired fins are transparent with brown spines an rays, the pelvic fins are also transparent but are marked with brown barring. There is a row of circular white spots just above the anal fin. The first dorsal fin is supported by 9 spines, the second dorsal fin contains 15-16 soft rays while the anal fin has12-13 soft rays. The pelvic fin contains a single spine and 3 soft rays, the pectoral fins have 15-16 soft rays and the caudal fin is truncate. The coralline sculpin has a maximum published total length of 14 cm (5.5 in).

== Distribution and habitat ==
Artedius corallinus Is found in the eastern Pacific Ocean from Orcas Island in Washington south to Isla San Martín, Baja California. this is a species which is found in cracks and under boulders in rocky areas from the intertidal zone down to 21 m (69 ft).

== Biology ==
Artedius corallinus feed on algae, amphipods, copepods, polychaetes, shrimps, and gastropods. They are oviparous and fertilization is external. In intertidal areas these fish may have a home pool to which they retreat at low tide but as the tide comes in they follow the advancing waters to forage in pools farther up the beach.
