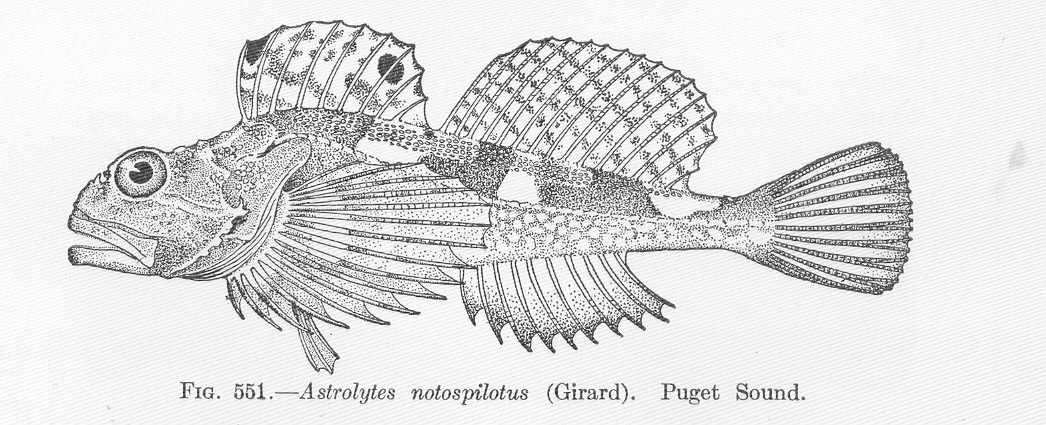

Scientific classification
- Kingdom: Animalia
- Phylum: Chordata
- Class: Actinopterygii
- Order: Perciformes
- Suborder: Cottoidei
- Family: Psychrolutidae
- Genus: Artedius
- Species: A. notospilotus

Binomial name
- Artedius notospilotus Girard, 1856

= Artedius notospilotus =

Species of fish

Artedius notospilotus, the bonehead sculpin, is a species of marine ray-finned fish belonging to the family Cottidae, the typical sculpins.

The bonehead sculpin is characterized by its unique head shape, which resembles a blunt "bone" or ridge. Another distinguishing characteristic is the lack of scales under the anterior portion of the orbit of their eye. They are distinguished from other species of sculpin by their pigmentation, with the body ranging in shades of brown, gray, and green in a honeycomb pattern. The species lack scales below the eyes but are found on the head and the ridge of the back. Their broad head features conspicuous spines and large dorsal eyes with a smooth body. Their dorsal fin has 14–16 rays, their anal fin has 11–13 rays, and the pectoral fin has 15–17 rays. A black spot can typically be located between the first and second spines of the dorsal fin and the end of the fin. Commonly found in the intertidal zone to depths of 170 feet, the species has a range extending from the Puget Sound, Washington to the Baja California peninsula. Bonehead sculpin grow to 25 centimeters. Their spawning seasons are in spring and winter and their preferred nursery habitats are seawater, polyhaline, and mesohaline. It serves as the host for Podocotyle enophrysi, a species of parasitic flatworm. The bonehead sculpin has not yet been formally evaluated for conservation status.
