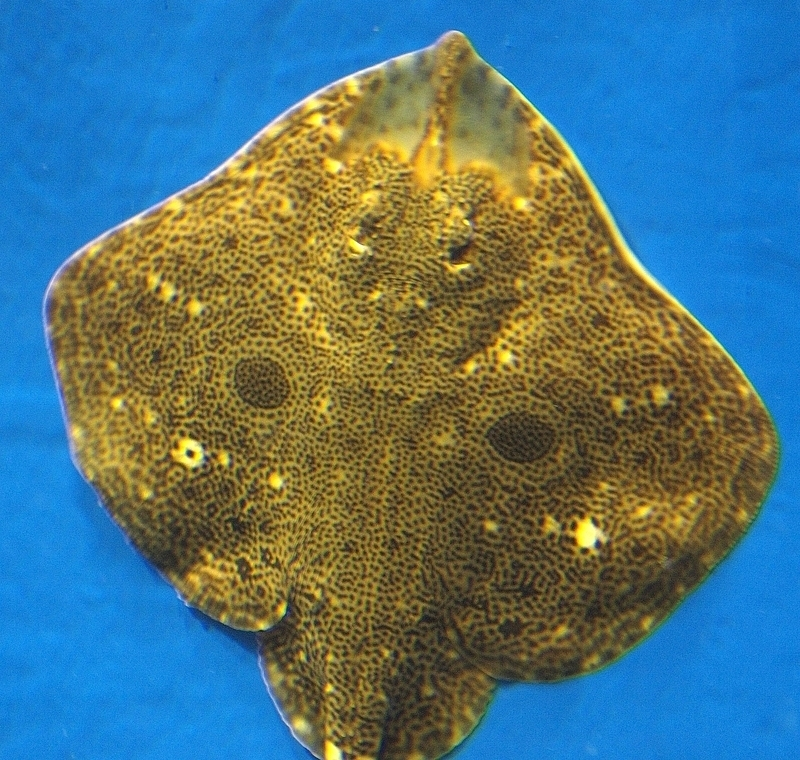

Conservation status
- Vulnerable (IUCN 3.1)

Scientific classification
- Kingdom: Animalia
- Phylum: Chordata
- Class: Chondrichthyes
- Subclass: Elasmobranchii
- Order: Rajiformes
- Family: Rajidae
- Genus: Okamejei
- Species: O. kenojei

Binomial name
- Okamejei kenojei (Müller & Henle, 1841)

Synonyms
- Raja fusca Garman, 1885; Raja japonica Nyström, 1887; Raja karagea Tanaka, 1927; Raja katsukii Tanaka, 1927; Raja kenojei Müller & Henle, 1841; Raja porosa Günther, 1874; Raja tobae Tanaka, 1916

= Ocellate spot skate =

Species of fish

The ocellate spot skate (Okamejei kenojei), also known as the spiny rasp skate or swarthy skate, is a species of skate in the family Rajidae and is commonly found in the north-western Pacific Ocean. O. kenojei is a bottom-feeding carnivore that consumes mainly shrimp, fishes, and crabs. Its diet also includes small quantities of amphipods, mysids, cephalopods, euphausiids, copepods, isopods, and polychaetes.

== Anatomy ==
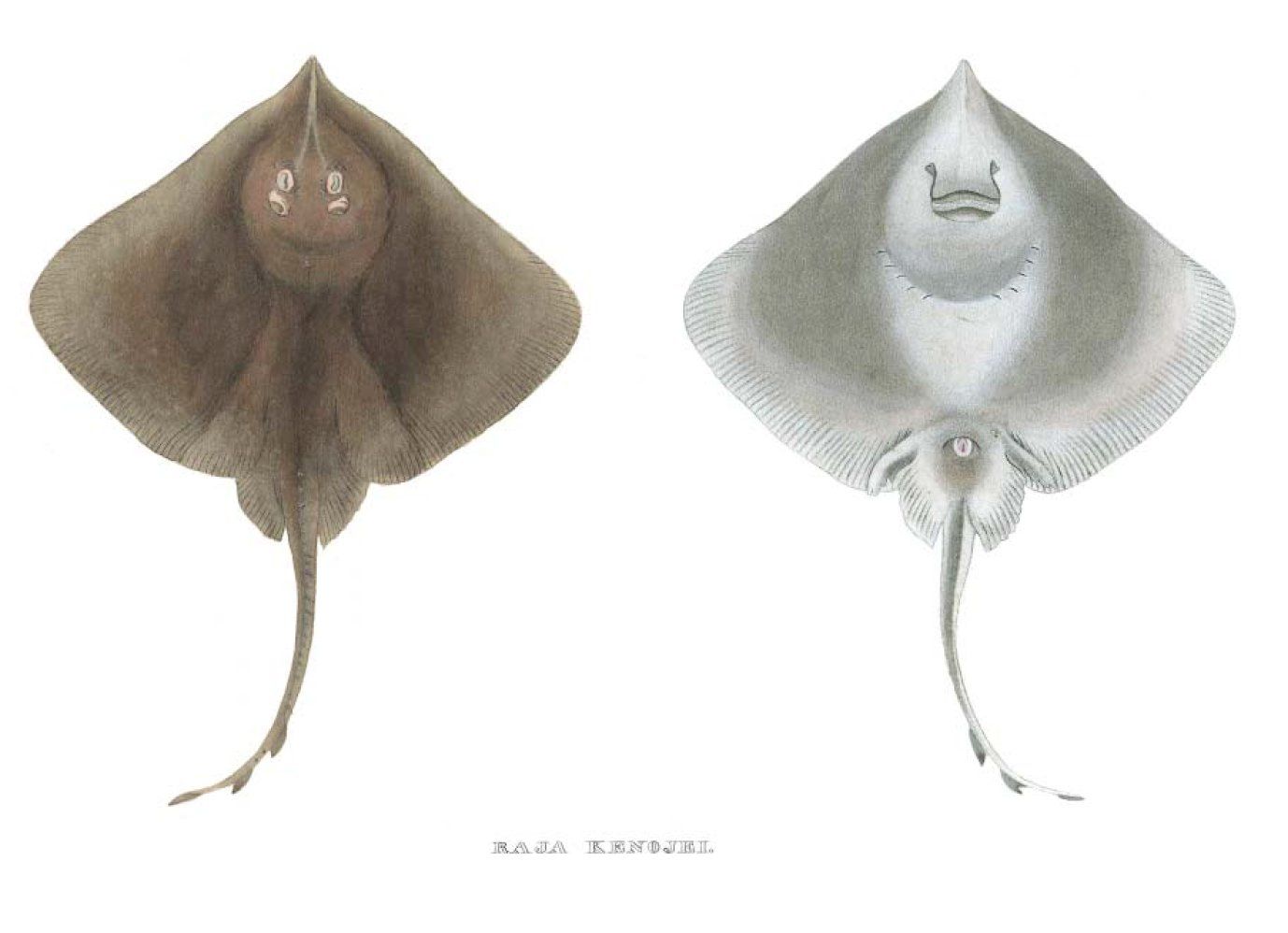
Dorsal (top) and ventral (bottom) views of the ocellate spot skate (Okamejei kenojei).

The ocellate spot skate has a flattened, disc-shaped body with broad pectoral fins fused to the head and trunk, forming wing-like structures used for swimming.

The dorsal (upper) surface is brown to grayish-brown, often with small dark spots. A row of thorns runs along the midline of the back, with additional thorns on each shoulder. Two small dorsal fins are located near the tip of the tail. Unlike many other skates, this species lacks a venomous tail spine.

The ventral (lower) surface is pale white to cream-colored. The mouth and five pairs of gill slits are located on the underside. The pelvic fins are divided into two distinct lobes. Males have claspers, which are elongated pelvic fin extensions used for internal fertilization.

This species reaches a maximum total length of approximately 60–70 cm (24–28 in).

== Human use ==
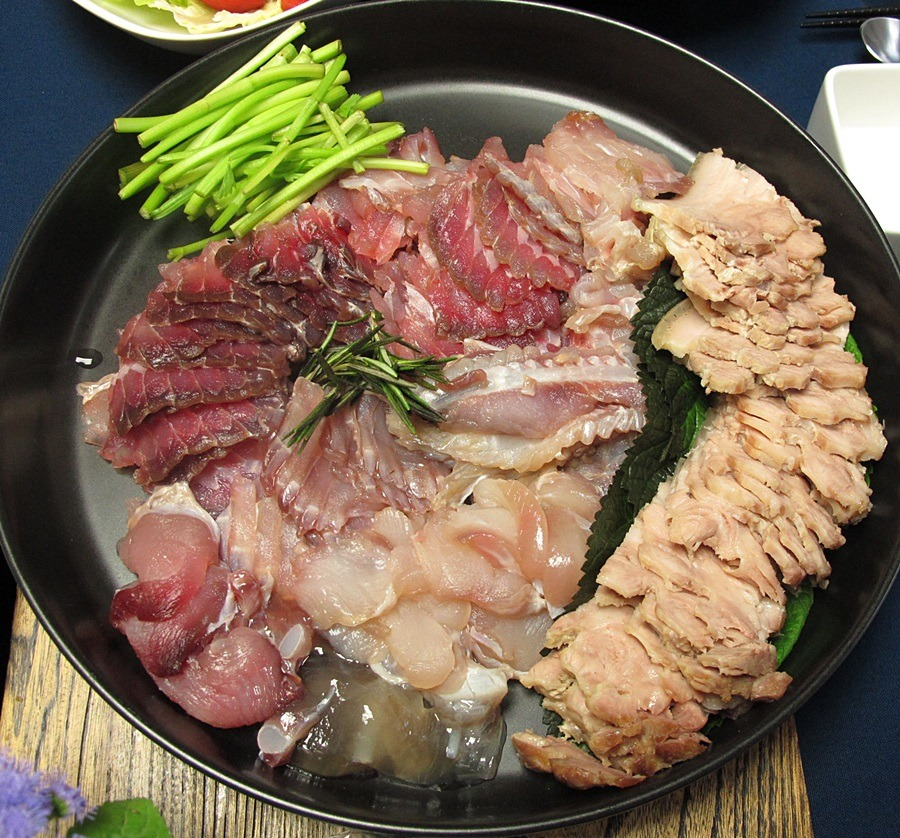
Hongeo-hoe

This species is the traditional source used to produce hongeo-hoe, a Korean fermented skate dish known for its strong ammonia-like aroma. The skate's unique physiology, excreting uric acid through the skin, creates the distinctive pungent flavor when fermented.
