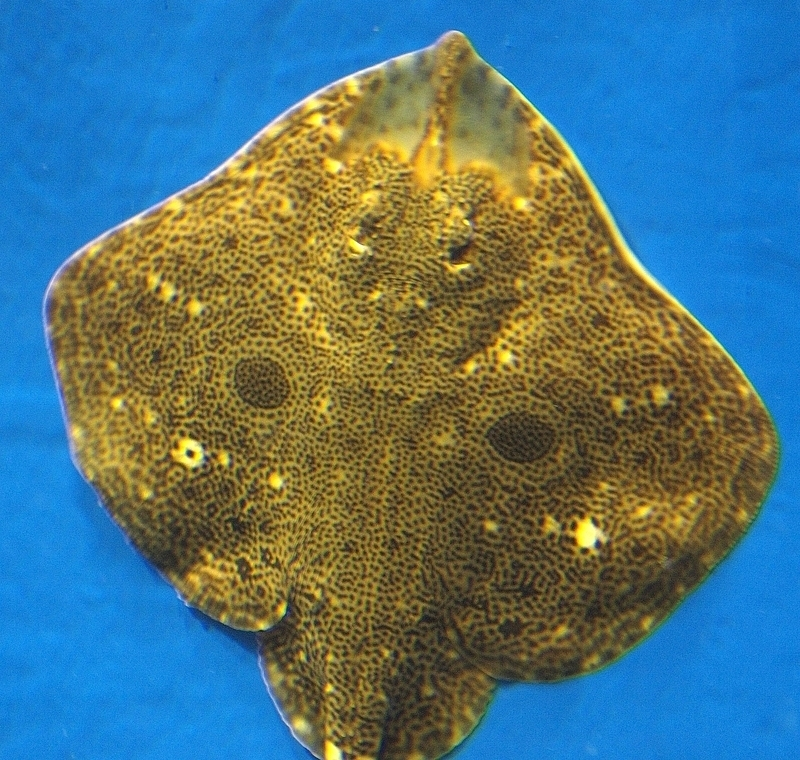
- Okamejei kenojei

Scientific classification
- Kingdom: Animalia
- Phylum: Chordata
- Class: Chondrichthyes
- Subclass: Elasmobranchii
- Order: Rajiformes
- Family: Rajidae
- Genus: Okamejei; Ishiyama, 1958

Type species
- Raja fusca Garman, 1885

= Okamejei =

Genus of cartilaginous fishes

Okamejei is a genus of small skates in the family Rajidae from the central and western Indo-Pacific, and the north-western Pacific Ocean.

== Species ==
Three species formerly placed in this genus were moved to Orbiraja in 2016. There are currently 14 recognized species in Okamejei:

- Okamejei acutispina (Ishiyama, 1958) (Sharpspine skate)
- Okamejei arafurensis Last & Gledhill, 2008 (Arafura skate)
- Okamejei boesemani (Ishihara, 1987) (Boeseman's skate)
- Okamejei cairae Last, Fahmi & Ishihara, 2010 (Borneo sand skate)
- Okamejei heemstrai (McEachran & Fechhelm, 1982) (East African skate)
- Okamejei hollandi (D. S. Jordan & R. E. Richardson, 1909) (Yellow-spotted skate)
- Okamejei kenojei (J. P. Müller & Henle, 1841) (Ocellate spot skate)
- Okamejei leptoura Last & Gledhill, 2008 (Thin-tail skate)
- Okamejei meerdervoortii (Bleeker, 1860) (Bigeye skate)
- Okamejei mengae Jeong, Nakabo & H. L. Wu, 2007
- Okamejei ornata Weigmann, Stehmann & Thiel, 2015 (Ornate skate)
- Okamejei panayensis Misawa, Babaran & Motomura, 2022
- Okamejei picta Ng, Ho, Joung & Liu, 2023
- Okamejei schmidti (Ishiyama, 1958) (Browneye skate)
