= Hongeo-hoe =

Korean fermented fish dish

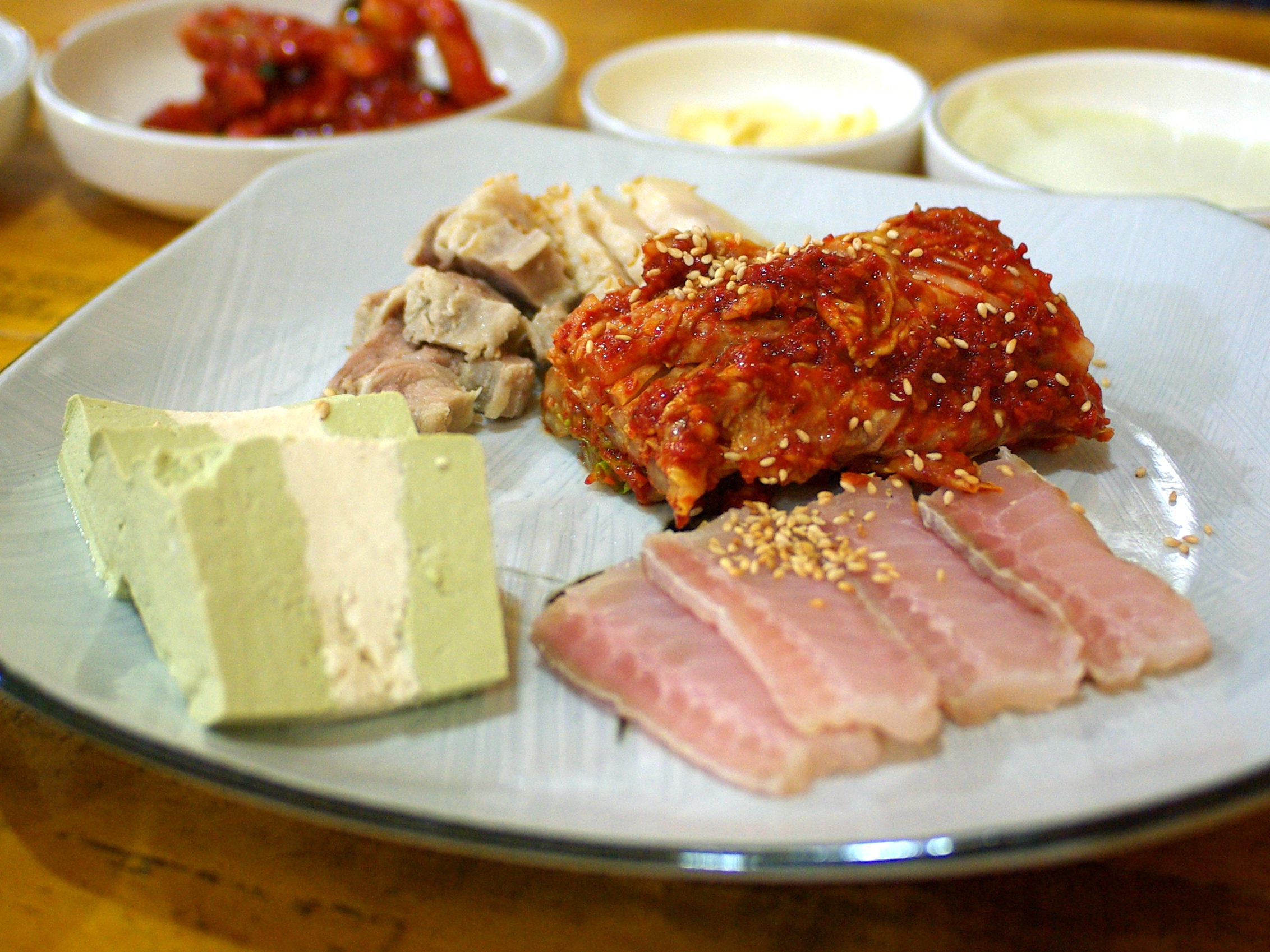
- Hongeo-samhap, consisting of hongeo-hoe served with kimchi and bossam
- Type: Hoe
- Place of origin: Heuksando
- Region or state: Honam
- Main ingredients: Fermented ocellate spot skate

Korean name
- Hangul: 홍어회
- Hanja: 洪魚膾
- RR: hongeohoe
- MR: hongŏhoe
- IPA: [hoŋ.ʌ.ɦwe̞]

Hongeo-hoe (Korean: 홍어회) is a type of fermented fish dish from Korea's Jeolla province. Hongeo-hoe is made from skate and emits a very strong, characteristic ammonia-like odor that has been described as being "reminiscent of an outhouse".

Fermented skate is also enjoyed in Iceland under the name kæst skata. It is typically eaten on Þorláksmessa, December 23.

== Origin ==
Skates (hongeo) are cartilaginous fish that excrete uric acid through the skin, rather than by urinating as other animals do. As they ferment, ammonia is produced, which helps preserve the flesh and gives the fish its distinctive, powerful odor.

The natural preservative effect of the fermentation process on skate meat was noted by Korean fishermen as early as the 14th century, during the Goryeo dynasty, long before refrigeration was invented. It was found that skates were the only fish that could be transported over long distances or stored for extended periods without rotting, even in the absence of salt.

== Production ==
Originally, the skates used in the production of hongeo-hoe were harvested locally from the waters around Heuksando, an island off the southwestern coast of Korea.

In more recent years, a larger proportion has been made with less expensive imported fish, mainly from Chile, although skate from Heuksando still retains a reputation for superior quality. The traditional species used for hongeo-hoe is the Korean skate (Hongeo koreana) while the ocellate spot skate (Okamejei kenojei) has been increasingly used due to scarcity of the former. Following the arrival of Korean skate traders in the early 1990s, the Roughskin skate (Dipturus trachyderma) became increasingly targeted by Chilean industrial trawl fisheries to supply the international market for hongeo-hoe.

Specific production techniques vary from shop to shop, influenced in part by the local climate. According to the traditional method, after the fish are cleaned and eviscerated, they would be stored either in compost (in cold regions) or in piles of straw (in warmer regions) and left to ferment. In the present day, due to concerns over food safety and product consistency, the use of refrigeration has become more common. Under one modern method, the fish undergo fermentation in a walk-in refrigerator for as much as 15 days at 2.5 °C (36.5 °F), and then for approximately 15 more days at 1 °C (34 °F).

After fermentation, the preserved skates are sliced into small pieces and packed into boxes for shipment.

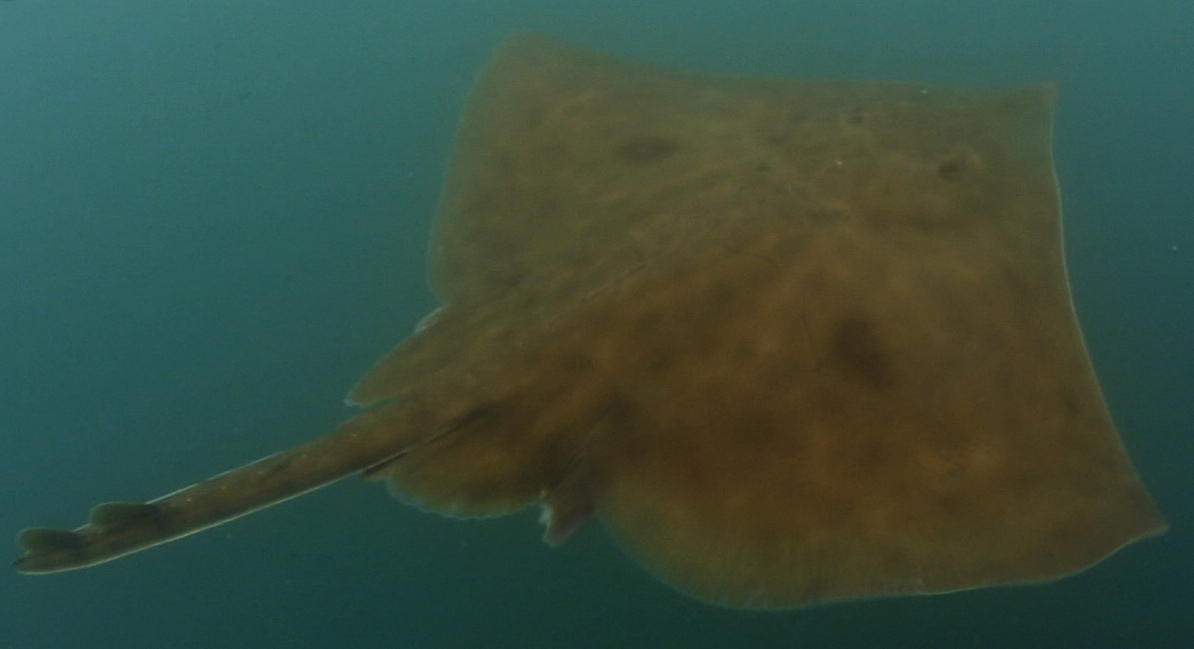
Korean skate (Hongeo koreana). This species is endemic to the waters off the southwestern coast of the Korean Peninsula. It is listed as Critically Endangered on the IUCN Red List due to overexploitation and population decline.

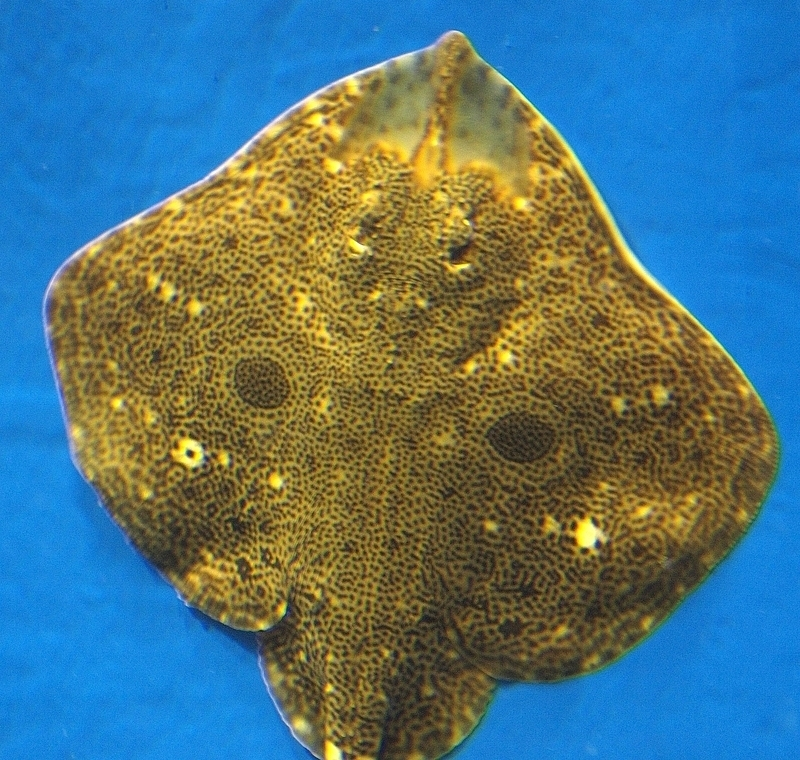
Okamejei kenojei (Ocellate spot skate), one of the species used to produce hongeo-hoe

== Eating ==
Hongeo-hoe is typically presented to diners as small slabs, sashimi-style, without being subjected to cooking or further preparation.

Jeolla natives claim that hongeo-hoe should be consumed plain. However, the dish is often eaten together with bossam and kimchi, a combination known as hongeo samhap (홍어 삼합). It is also often served with the Korean alcoholic beverage makgeolli, which can allay the pungency of the fermented dish.

In addition to the fermented meat, many restaurants will also serve non-fermented hoe preparations of the highly fatty liver of the skate (홍어애, hong'eo-ae). Other organs such as the spleen (홍어 곁간, hong'eo gyeotgan, literally "skate side-liver") may also be featured. Cooked skate dishes such as steamed skate, hongeo jjim and skate pancakes (jeon) may also be options.

Some diners find the strong ammonia-like odor and flavor of hongeo-hoe unpalatable, and the dish is often described as an acquired taste even among Koreans.

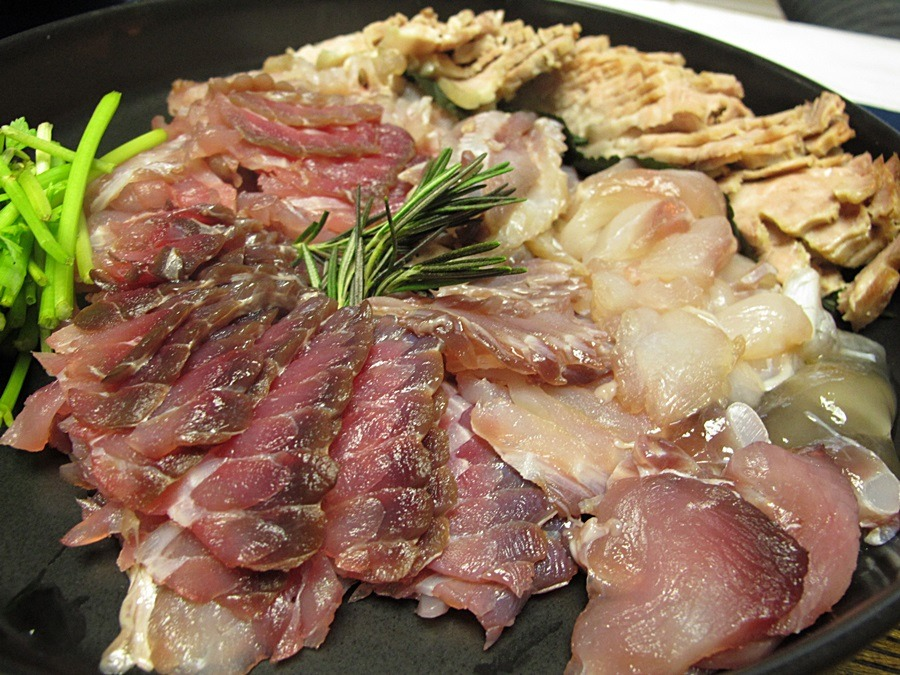
Platter of Hongeo-hoe

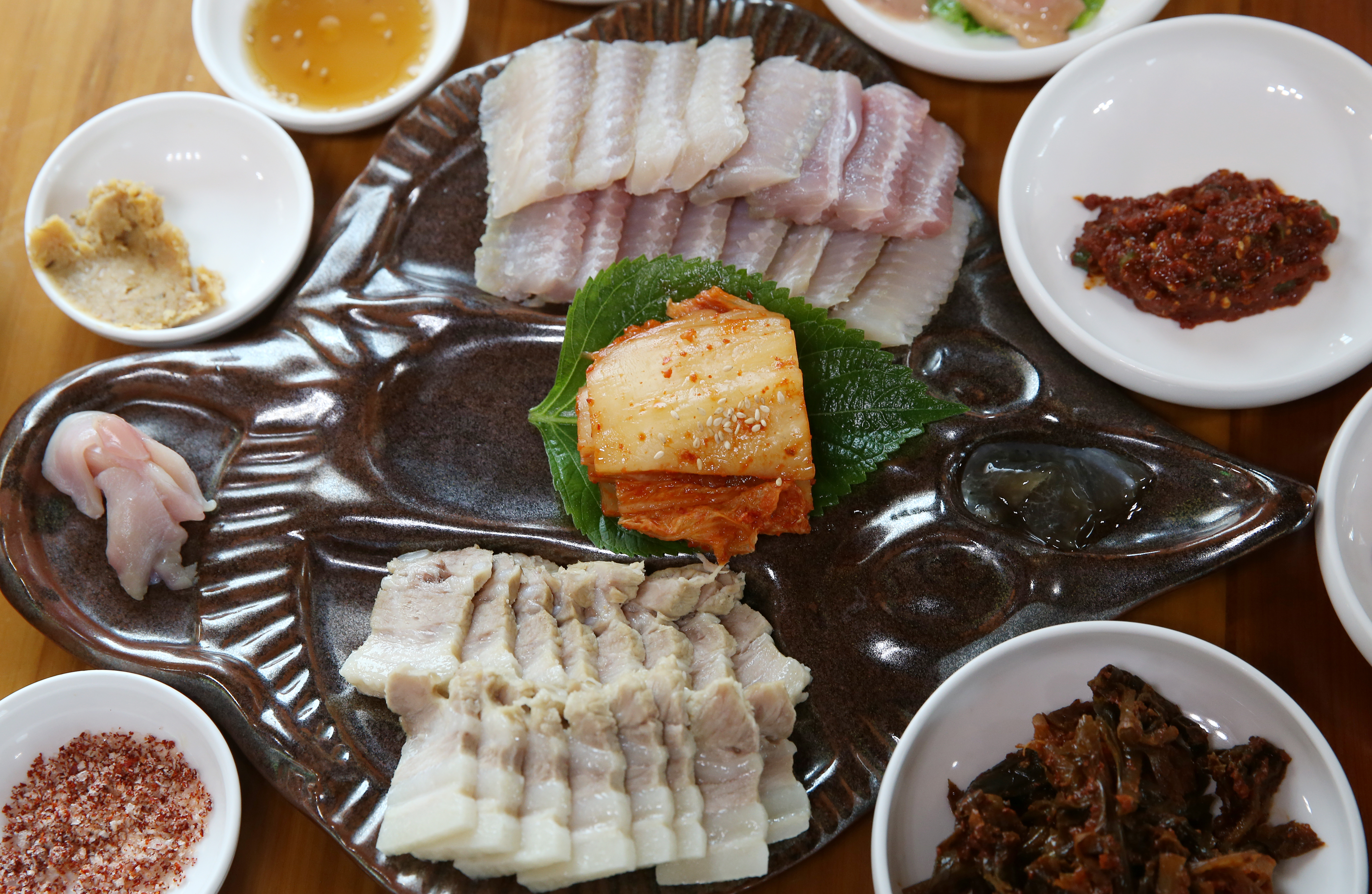
Hongeo triple combination (홍어 삼합, hong'eo samhap). Central trio, from top: hongeo, mugeunji, steamed pork. Various banchan surround the main three dishes.

== Safety ==
During fermentation, like other fermented foods, skate flesh accumulates biogenic amines including histamine, tyramine, putrescine, and cadaverine produced by bacterial decarboxylation of amino acids. Consumption of foods containing high levels of these compounds can cause toxic effects such as headache, nausea, diarrhea, flushing, and cardiac palpitations, particularly in individuals with reduced diamine oxidase activity or those taking monoamine oxidase inhibitor medications. The dominant bacterial genera responsible for fermentation (Psychrobacter, Pseudomonas, Clostridium, and Oblitimonas) are associated with nitrogen compound accumulation and the characteristic ammonia flavor of hongeo.

Although no major food poisoning outbreaks have been documented, scientific studies confirm that histamine levels in fermented skate vary depending on processing methods, with higher concentrations potentially causing adverse reactions in sensitive individuals.

== See also ==
- Fesikh – Traditional Egyptian fermented fish
- Hákarl – National dish of Iceland consisting of fermented shark
- Hongeo muchim – Korean fermented fish dish
- Lutefisk – Nordic dried fish dish
- Surströmming – Swedish fermented Baltic Sea herring
