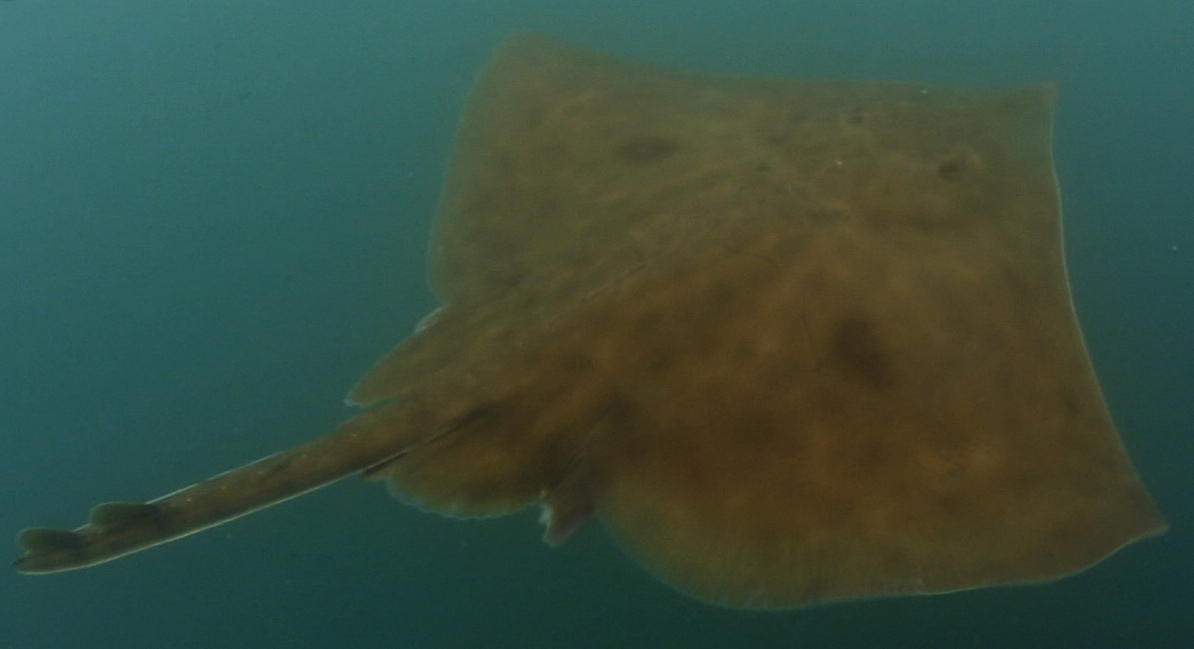

Conservation status
- Critically Endangered (IUCN 3.1)

Scientific classification
- Domain: Eukaryota
- Kingdom: Animalia
- Phylum: Chordata
- Class: Chondrichthyes
- Subclass: Elasmobranchii
- Order: Rajiformes
- Family: Rajidae
- Genus: Hongeo; Jeong & Nakabo, 2009
- Species: H. koreana

Binomial name
- Hongeo koreana (Jeong & Nakabo, 1997)

Synonyms
- Raja koreana Jeong & Nakabo, 1997

= Korean skate =

Species of cartilaginous fish

The Korean skate (Hongeo koreana) is a skate in the family Rajidae, and is the sole member of the genus Hongeo. It was previously classified in the genus Raja as Raja koreana until discoveries identified this species as a member of a distinct genus. It is considered Critically Endangered on the IUCN Red List due to overexploitation.

== Taxonomy and systematics ==
=== Mitochondrial genome ===
The complete mitochondrial genome was investigated in 2014. The genome is 16,906 base pairs in length, and contains 2 rRNA, 22 tRNA, and 13 protein coding genes. The genome has the same gene order and structure as genomes of the other Rajidae species, which is the family that Hongeo koreana belongs to.

=== Etymology ===
- Hongeo comes from the Korean word for 'skate', hong-eo (홍어).
- koreana comes from its geographic range in the Korean waters where it was collected.

== Description ==
The Korean skate has a relatively short, deep snout that is slightly obtuse. Its mouth is weakly arched and large, with 51 rows of teeth. It has five pairs of gill slits. For fins, the Korean skate has two dorsal fins located near each other close to the tip of the tail, with a small, low caudal fin located near to the second dorsal fin. Its tail is shorter than its body length, with a groove along the ventral midline and a well-developed lateral fold on the tail, extending to the tip of the tail.

Its coloration is slightly different for males than females as the males are overall blacker than females, but other than that they look very similar in terms of color. The females’ dorsal surface is brown with scattered dark brown spots and indistinct marks. The ventral surface is black/brown with gray surrounding the pores (the nostrils and gill slits). Similarly, the tail's dorsal surface is brown with 3 brown bands and dark brown spots, while the tail's ventral surface is gray.

The Korean skate has several distinct characteristics. One is cartilage that is continuous with the neurocranium. The cartilage is proximally stout, very slender, and distally uncalcified. Another is a distinct row of thorns along the midline of the dorsal surface of the tail. Both males and females display this row of thorns. Most thorns are directed anteriorly.

== Distribution and habitat ==
The Korean skate is found mostly in the southern coast of the Korean Peninsula, in a relatively small area including the Jeju Strait, Heuksan Islands, and Cheongsando. The species has also been found off the shore of Japan, near Tsushima Island and the Gotō Islands, but these reports are rarer.

Their depth range is 30–110 metres (98–361 ft), off the southern coast of the Korean Peninsula, and 30–180 metres (98–591 ft) when they have been found off the coast of Japan.

== Life cycle ==
The Korean skate is oviparous, meaning that they lay eggs. The females lay the eggs on muddy or sandy substrates. The embryos feed solely on yolk when in the egg. The eggs have horn-like projections on the shell.

== Consumption ==
Hongeo koreana is a relatively high commercial fishery target species in southern Korea. A Korean fish specialty dish is Hongeo-hoe (홍어회), which is a fermented skate dish that is famous for its sharp, pungent aroma and a texture that is hard to swallow due to the fish's cartilage. The dish is usually prepared and eaten raw. Not all Hongeo-hoe is made from Hongeo koreana, but any skate can be used, including the Korean skate.
