= Alfred Cleveland Weed =

American biologist who traveled to the Arctic

Alfred Weed
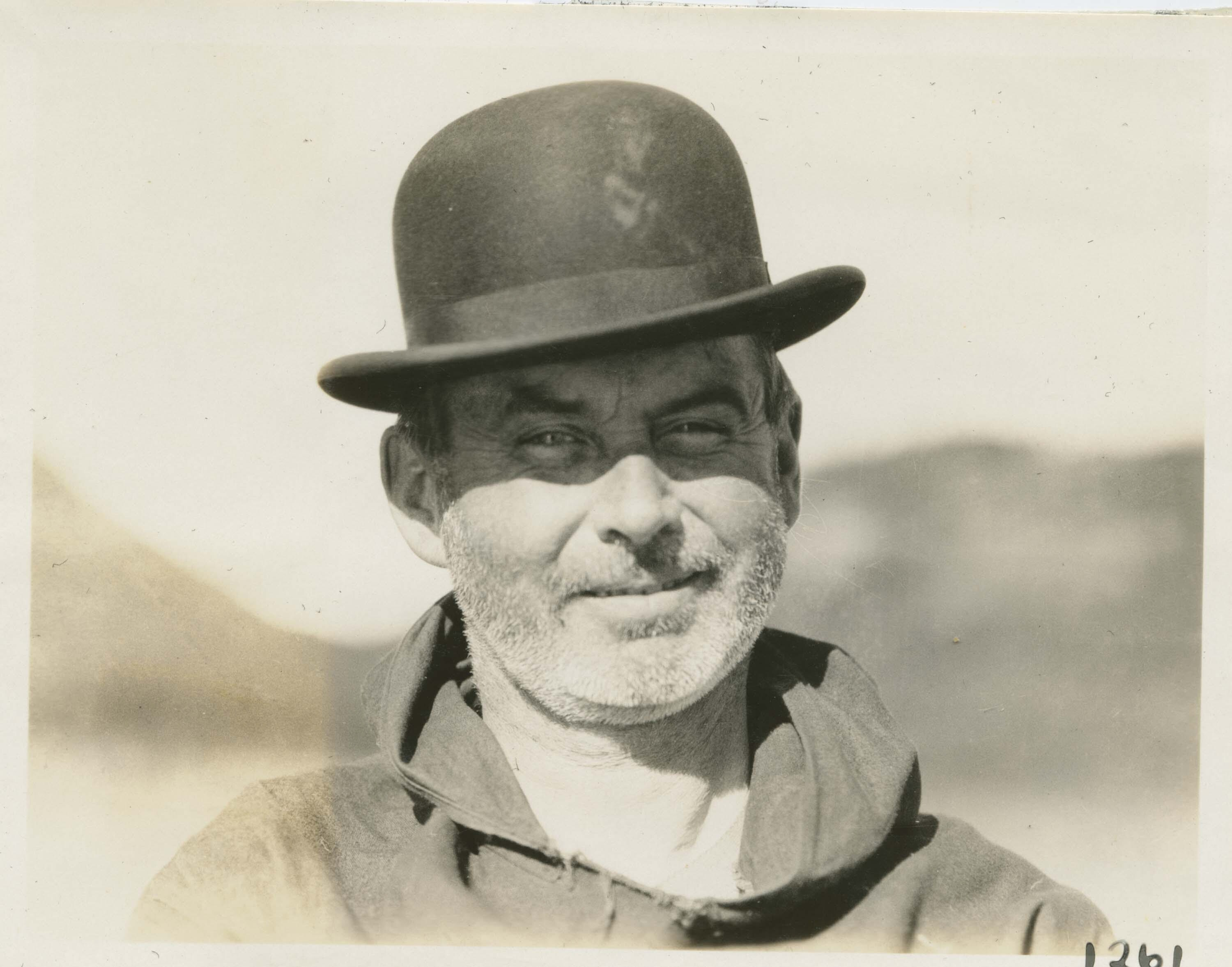
- Born: 1881; North Rose, New York
- Died: 1953 (aged 71–72)
- Other names: Alfred Cleveland Weed; Alfred C. Weed
- Occupation: ichthyologist
- Known for: Catalogued Arctic fish

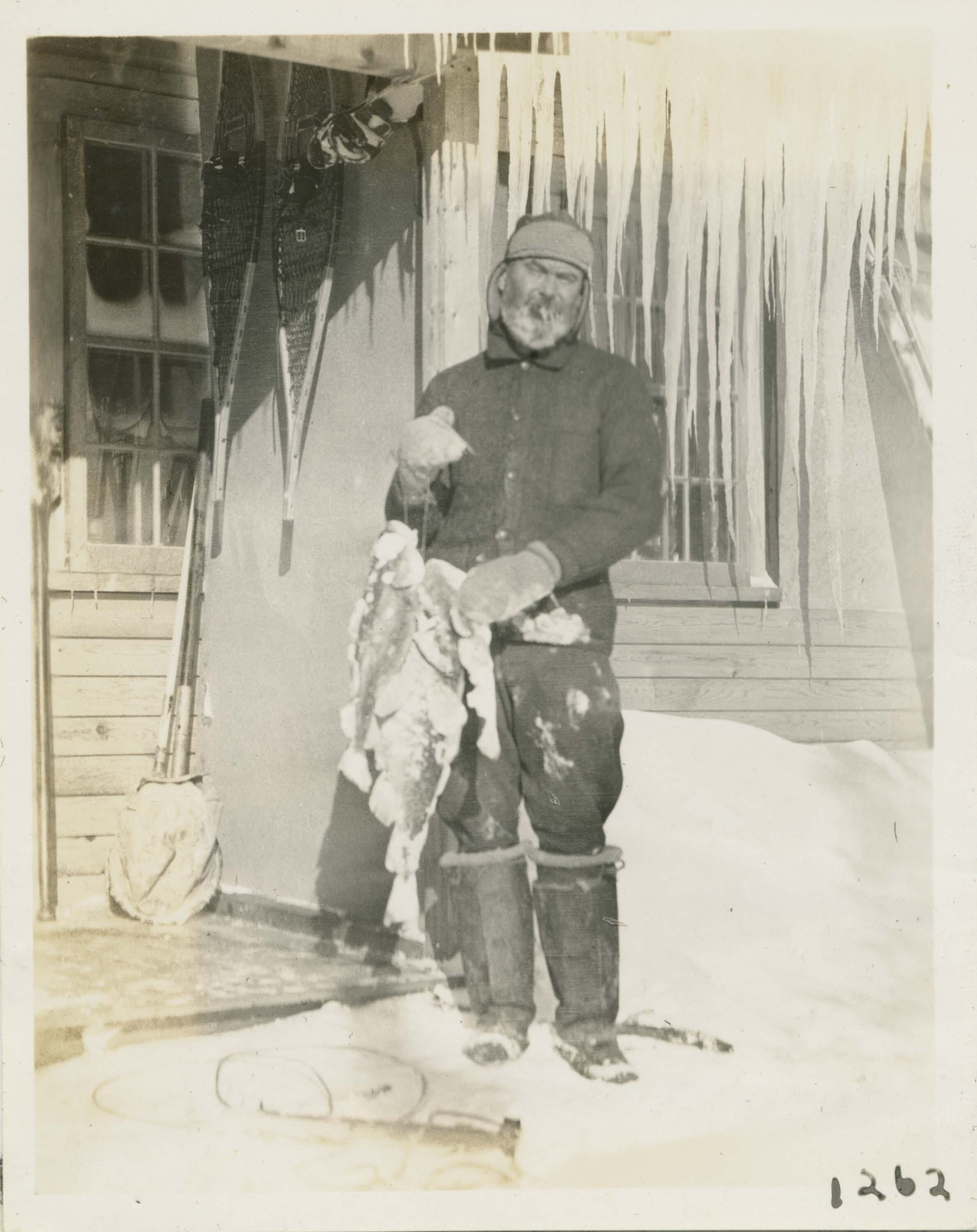
Alfred C. Weed, with rock cod, during an expedition to the Arctic, in 1931.

Alfred Cleveland Weed was an American ichthyologist, known for expeditions to the Arctic, where he catalogued the region's fish.

Weed was born in North Rose, New York, and earned his bachelor's degree at Cornell University.

He was hired as assistant curator of the Field Museum of Natural History in 1921. By his retirement, in 1942, he was serving as full curator of the Fishery department.

He made multiple scientific field trips to Labrador and Greenland in the 1920s and 1930s.
