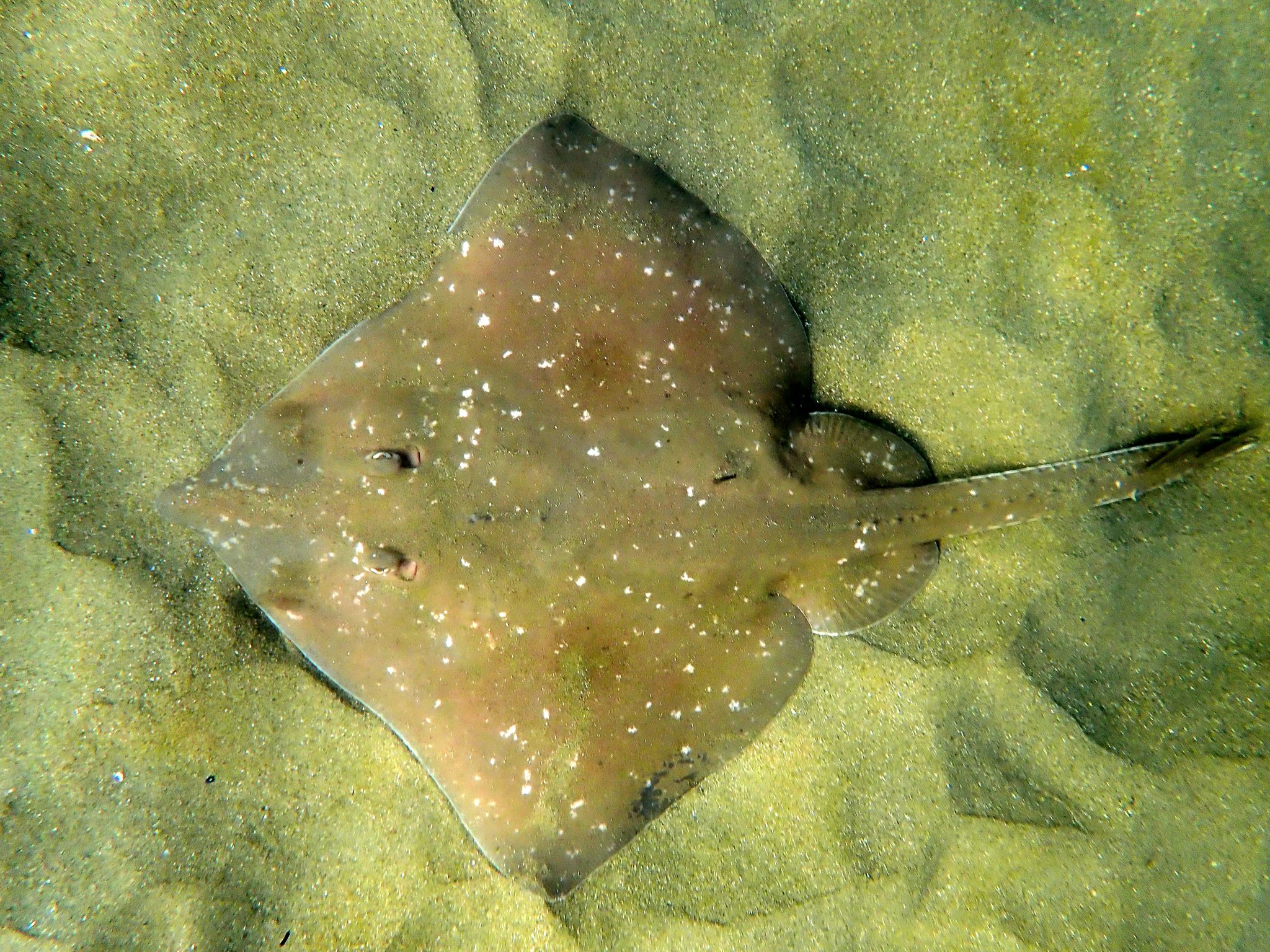
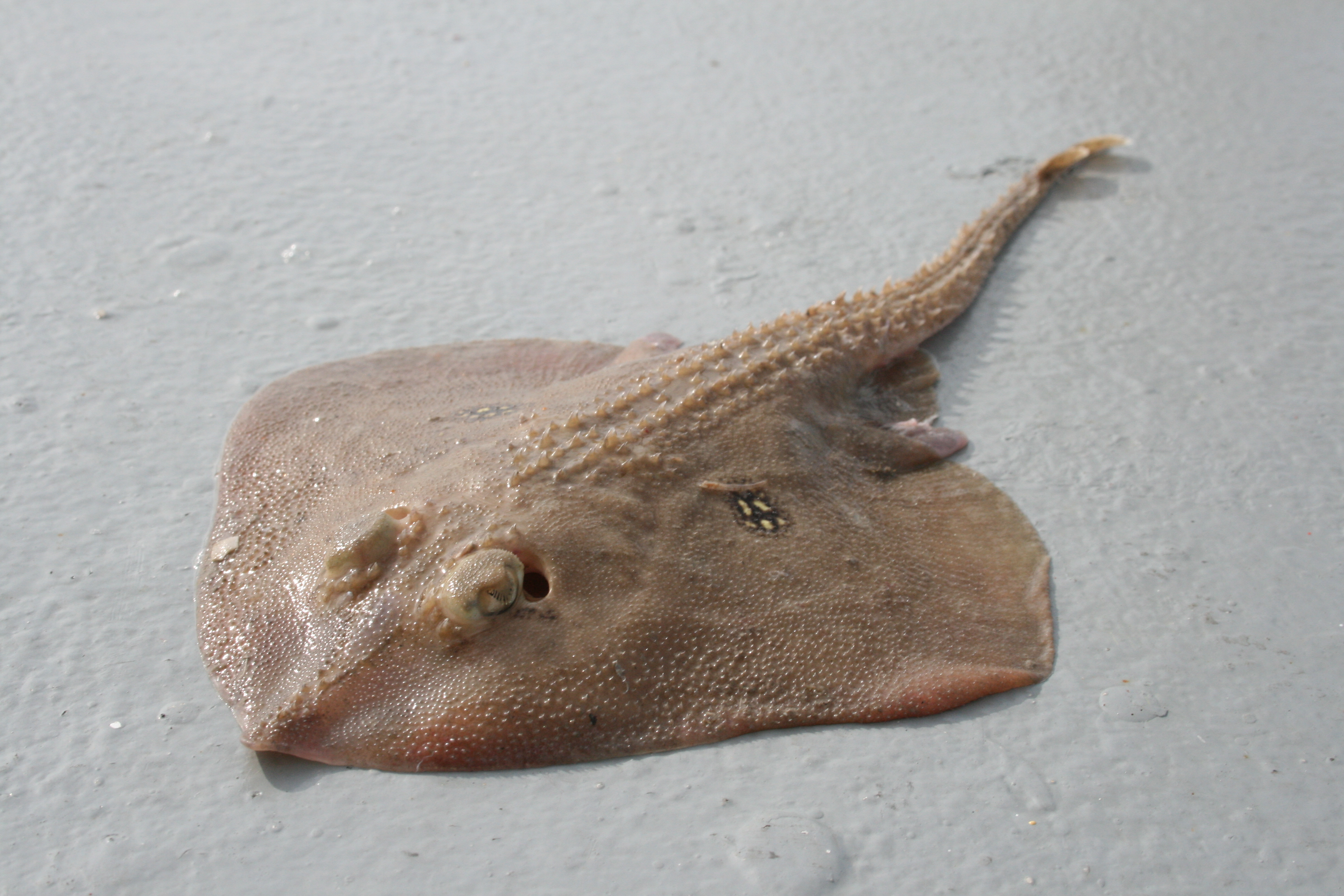
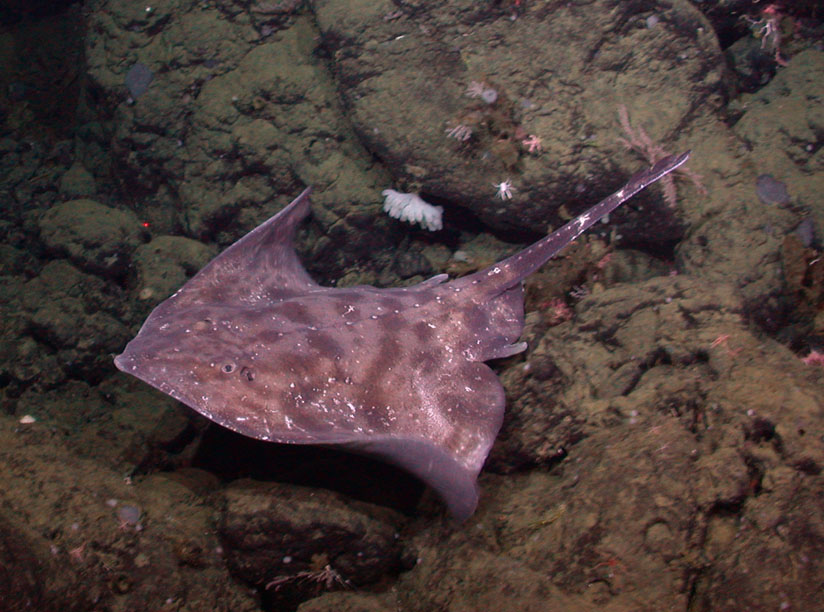
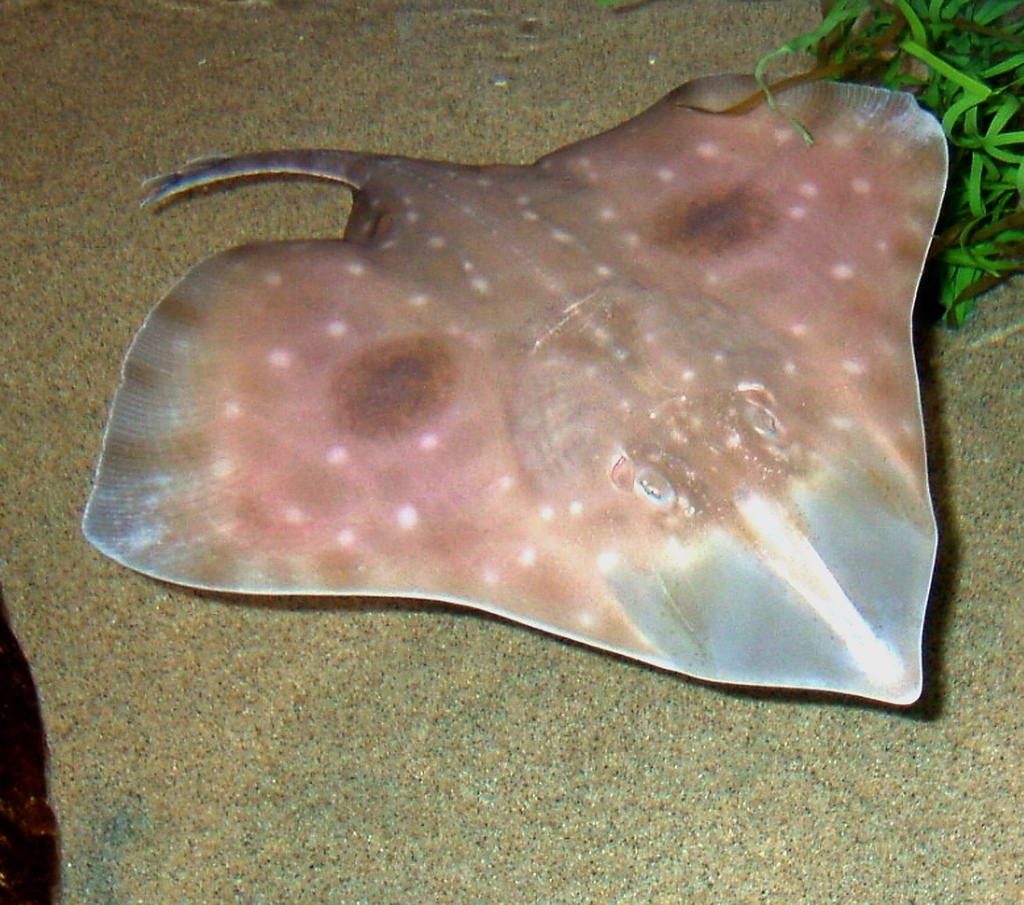
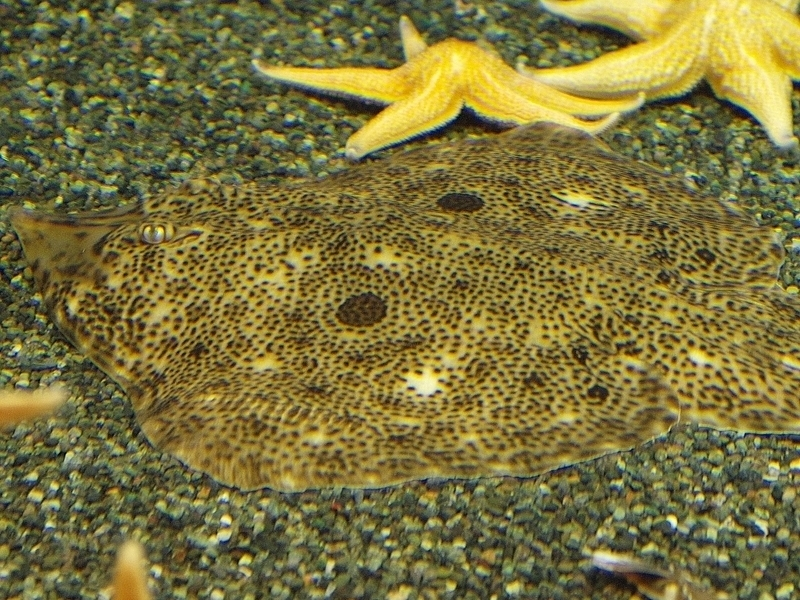
- Melbourne skate Cuckoo skate Broad skate Thorny skate Big skate Ocellate spot skate

Scientific classification
- Kingdom: Animalia
- Phylum: Chordata
- Class: Chondrichthyes
- Subclass: Elasmobranchii
- Order: Rajiformes
- Family: Rajidae; Bonaparte, 1831

= Skate (fish) =

Skates Temporal range: Late Cretaceous – Recent

Family of fishes

Skates are cartilaginous fish belonging to the family Rajidae in the superorder Batoidea of rays. More than 150 species have been described, in 17 genera. Softnose skates and pygmy skates were previously treated as subfamilies of Rajidae (Arhynchobatinae and Gurgesiellinae), but are now considered as distinct families. Alternatively, the name "skate" is used to refer to the entire order of Rajiformes (families Anacanthobatidae, Arhynchobatidae, Gurgesiellidae and Rajidae).

Members of Rajidae are distinguished by a stiff snout and a rostrum that is not reduced.

== Taxonomy and systematics ==
=== Evolution ===
Skates belong to the ancient lineage of cartilaginous fishes. Fossil denticles (tooth-like scales in the skin) resembling those of today's chondrichthyans date at least as far back as the Ordovician, with the oldest unambiguous fossils of cartilaginous fish dating from the middle Devonian. A clade within this diverse family, the Neoselachii, emerged by the Triassic, with the best-understood neoselachian fossils dating from the Jurassic. This clade is represented today by sharks, sawfish, rays and skates.

The body plan of skates is caused by skate-specific genomic rearrangements that have altered the three-dimensional regulatory landscape of genes. These changes arose about 286–221 million years ago when skates diverged from sharks.

=== Classification ===
The skate belongs to the class Chondrichthyes. This class consists of all the cartilaginous fishes, including sharks and stingrays. Chondrichthyes is divided into two subclasses; of which Elasmobranchii includes skates, rays, and sharks. The number of species is likely to increase as taxonomic issues are resolved and new species are identified. The following genera recognized in the family Rajidae:

- Amblyraja Malm, 1877
- Beringraja Ishihara, Treloar, Bor, Senou & Jeong, 2012
- Breviraja Bigelow & Schroeder, 1948
- Caliraja Ebert, 2022
- Dactylobatus Bean & Weed, 1909
- Dentiraja Whitley, 1940
- Dipturus Rafinesque, 1810
- Hongeo Jeong & Nakabo, 2009
- Leucoraja Malm, 1877
- Malacoraja Stehmann, 1970
- Neoraja McEachran & Compagno, 1982
- Okamejei Ishiyama, 1958
- Orbiraja Last, Weigmann & Dumale, 2016
- Raja Linnaeus, 1758
- Rajella Stehmann, 1970
- Rostroraja Hulley, 1972
- Spiniraja Whitley, 1939
- Zearaja Whitley 1939

The Rajidae are considered monophyletic because of their similarity in appearance. There are 18 genera. There are at least 45 dubious species of skates worldwide.

== Description ==
=== General Batoidea characteristics ===
Skates are cartilaginous fishes like other Chondrichthyes, however, skates, like rays and other Rajiformes, have a flat body shape with flat pectoral fins that extend the length of their body. This structure creates power for forward propulsion, providing the emergence swimming capabilities that enabled skates to colonize the sea floor.

A large portion of the skate's dorsal body is covered by rough skin made of placoid scales. Placoid scales have a pointed tip that is oriented caudally and are homologous to teeth. Their mouths are located on the underside of the body, with a jaw suspension common to Batoids known as euhyostyly. Skate's gill slits are located ventrally as well, but dorsal spiracles allow the skate to be partially buried in floor sediment and still complete respiratory exchange. Also located on the dorsal side of the skate are their two eyes which allow for predator awareness. In addition to their pectoral fins, skates have a first and second dorsal fin, caudal fin and paired pelvic fins. Distinct from their rhomboidal shape is a long fleshy slender tail. While skate anatomy is similar to other Batoidea, features such as their electric organ and mermaid's purse create clear distinctions.

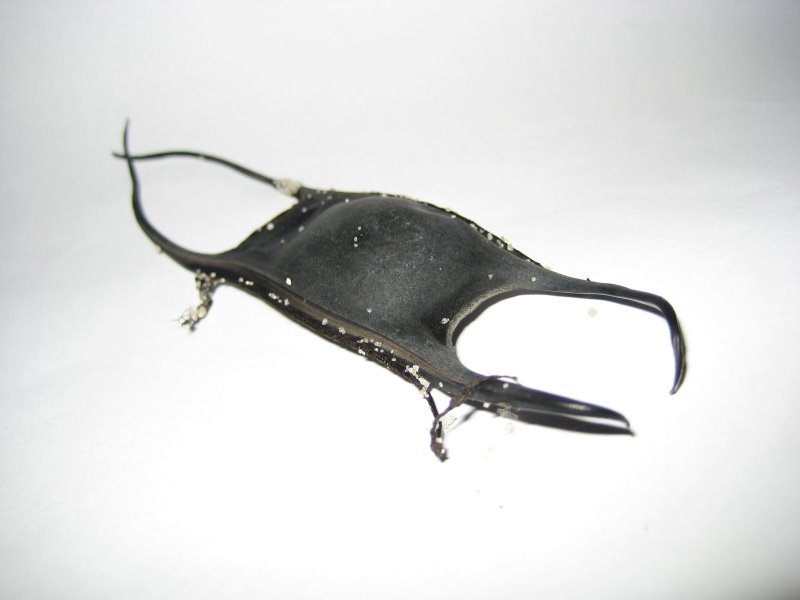
Full view of a skate's mermaid's purse. Roughly 125 mm in length.

=== Skate specific characteristics ===
==== Mermaid's purse ====
Skates produce their young in an egg case called a mermaid's purse. These egg cases have distinct characteristics that are individualized to each species. This makes a great tool for identifying different species of skates. One of these identifiable structures is the keel. The keel is a flexible ridge that runs along the outside of the structure. Another characteristic is the number of embryos in the egg case. Some species contain only one embryo while others can have up to seven. The size of the fibrous shell around the case is another characteristic. Some species have thick layers on the exterior.

==== Electric organ ====
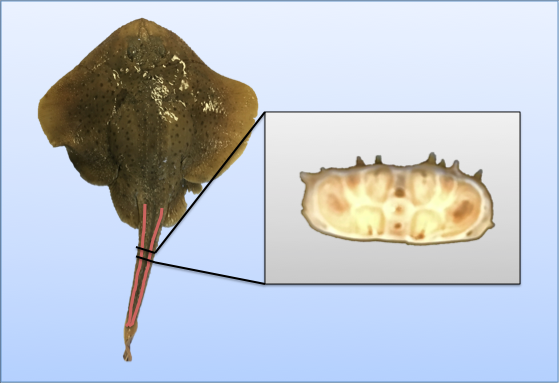
The fibers of the skate electric organ are embedded in the muscles located lateral to the notochord in the tail.

The electric organ is a characteristic exclusive to aquatic species. Among the Chondrichthyes, the only groups to possess electric organs are the electric ray and the skates. Unlike many other electrogenic fishes, skates are unique in having paired electric organs which run longitudinally through the tail in the lateral musculature of the notochord. The impulses put out by the electric organs of the skate are considered to be weak, asynchronous, long-lasting signals. Although the anatomy of the skate's electric organ is well described, its function is poorly understood. Some research suggests the electric impulses are too weak to be a mechanism used for defense or hunting. It is also too irregular to be useful for electrolocation purposes. The most reasonable explanation in the literature suggests that the electric organ discharges may be used as a form of communication used for reproduction purposes.

== Distribution and habitats ==
Skates are primarily found from the intertidal down to depths greater than 3,000 m (9,843 ft). They are most commonly found along outer continental shelves and upper slopes. They are typically more diverse at higher latitudes and in deep-water. In fact, skates are the only cartilaginous fish taxon to exhibit more diversity of species at higher latitudes. A cool, temperate to polar water in the deep sea can be a favorable environment for skates. As the water becomes more shallow and warmer, skates are seen to be replaced by stingrays. Skates are absent from brackish and freshwater environments. However, there is a single estuarine species that has been found in Tasmania, Australia. Also, the Connecticut Department of Environmental Protection has caught and studied skates within the Long Island Sound estuary. Some skate fauna have been found inhabiting areas of rock cobble and high rocky relief.

== Behavior and ecology ==
=== Reproduction ===
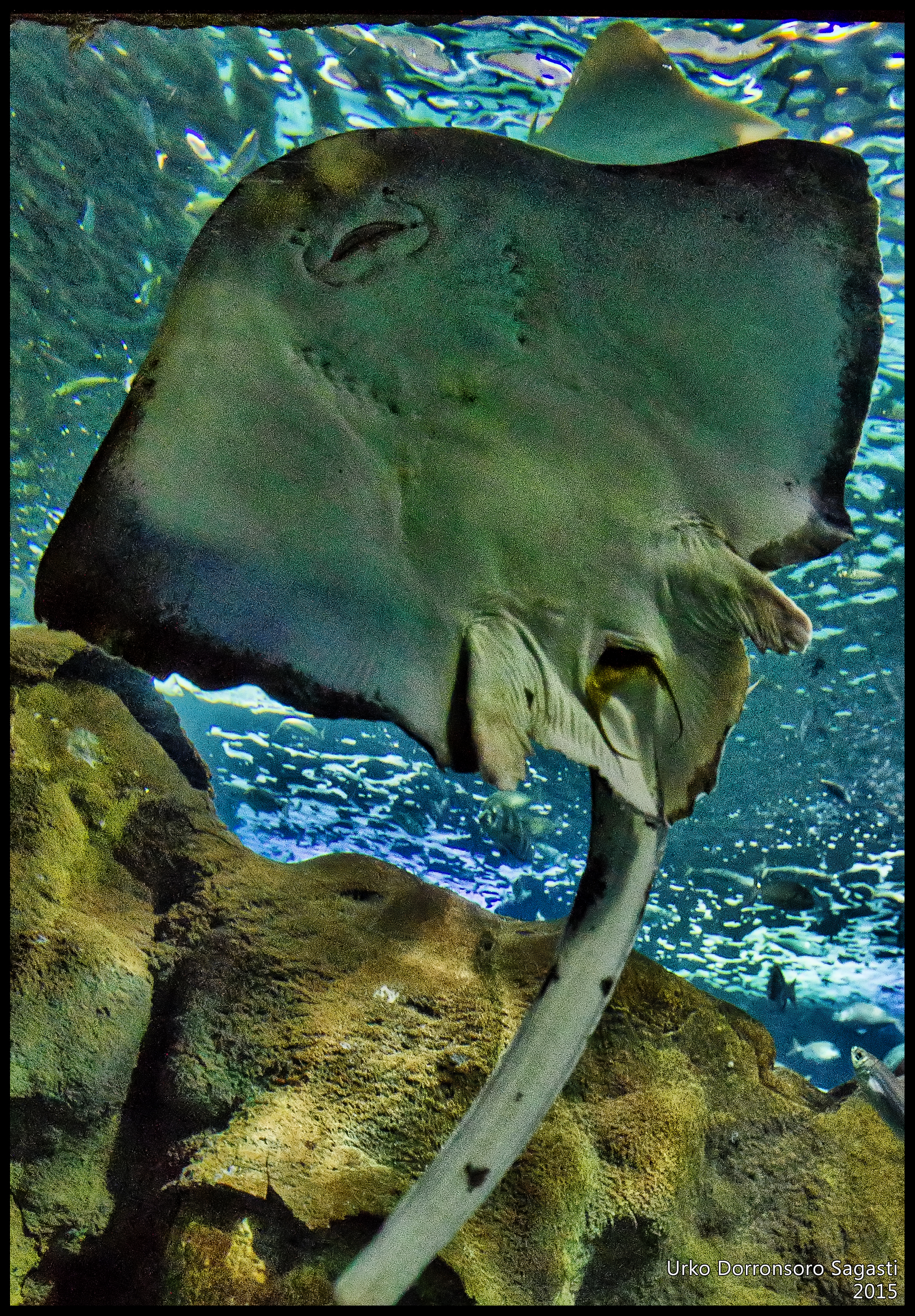
A skate laying an egg case (mermaid's purse) at the San Sebastian Aquarium

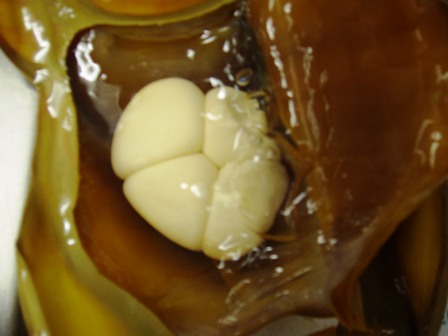
Four developing embryos located in an opened big skate egg case (mermaid's purse)

Skates mate at the same nursery ground each year. In order to fertilize the egg, males use claspers, a structure attached to the pelvic fins. The claspers allow them to direct the flow of semen into the female's cloaca. Skates are oviparous, meaning they lay eggs with very little development in the mother. This is one major difference from rays, which are viviparous, meaning they give birth to live young. When a female skate is fertilized, a protected case forms around the embryo called an egg case, or more commonly mermaid's purse. This egg case is then deposited out of the mother's body onto the ocean floor where the skates develop for up to 15 months before they enter the external environment.

=== Diet and feeding ===
The majority of skates feed on bottom dwelling animals, such as shrimp, crab, oyster, clams, and other invertebrates. To feed on these animals they have grinding plates in their mouths. Skates are an influential part of the food webs of demersal marine communities. They utilize similar resources to those of other upper trophic-level marine predators, such as seabirds, marine mammals, and sharks. The flattened body shape, ventral eyes and well developed spiracles of the skate allows them to live benthically, buried in the sediment or using a longitudinal undulation of the pectoral fins known as Rajiform locomotion to glide along the water floor. Current research suggests that some species of skates, in addition to their Rajiform locomotion, use their pelvic fins to perform ambulatory locomotion. This form of locomotion performed by the skate is being explored as a possible origin for our own development of walking by looking for similar neural pathways used for movement between skates and animals walking on land.

== Skates versus stingrays ==
Skates are like stingrays in that they have five pairs of gill slits that are located ventrally, which means on the underside of their body (unlike sharks that have their gills located on their sides). Skates and rays both have pectoral fins that are flat and expanded, which are typically fused to the head. Both skates and stingrays typically have their eyes on top of their head. Skates also share similar feeding habits with rays.

Skates are different from rays in that they lack a whip-like tail and stinging spines. However, some skates have electric organs located in their tail. The main difference between skates and rays is that skates lay eggs, whereas rays give birth to live young.

Moreover, skates can be more abundant than rays, and are fished for food in some parts of the world.

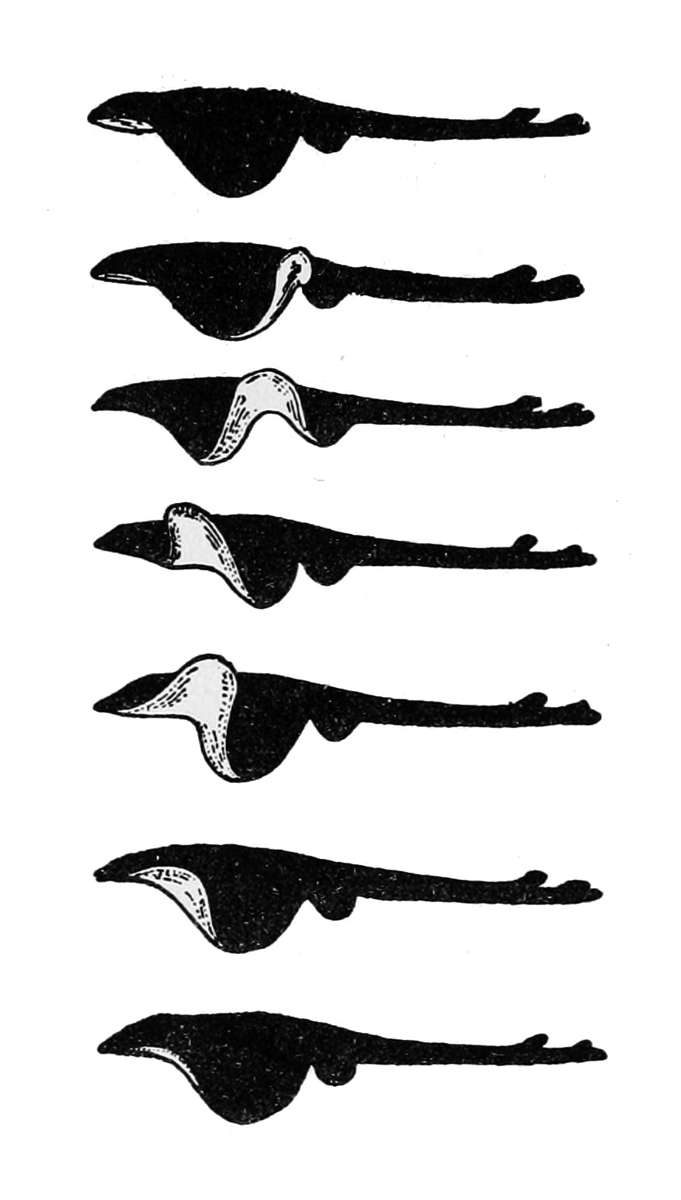
Skates swim with their pectoral fins

Comparison of skates and stingrays
Superficially, skates and stingrays appear somewhat similar. Skate Stingray However, there are fundamental differences.
Characteristic	Skates	Rays	Sources
Reproduction	Skates are oviparous, that is they lay eggs. Their fertilized eggs are laid in a protective hard case called a mermaid's purse.	Rays are viviparous, that is, they bear their young inside their bodies and give birth to them alive.	
Dorsal fin	Distinct	Missing or vestigial	
Pelvic fins	Fins are divided into two lobes	Fins have one lobe	
Tail	Fleshy tails which lack spines	Whip-like with one or two stinging spines	
Protection	Rely on "thorny projections on their backs and tails for protection from predators"	Rely on stinging spines or barbs for protection (though some, such as manta rays lack these)	
Teeth	Small	"Plate-like teeth adapted for crushing prey"	
Size	Usually smaller than rays	Usually larger than skates	
Colour	Often drab, brown or gray (but not always)	Often boldly patterned (but not always)	
Habitat	Often deep water (but not always)	Often shallow water (but not always)	

== Conservation ==
Skates have slow growth rates and, since they mature late, low reproductive rates. As a result, skates are vulnerable to overfishing and appear to have been overfished and are suffering reduced population levels in many parts of the world.

== As food ==
Like stingrays, skates are also used as food source in various types of dishes.

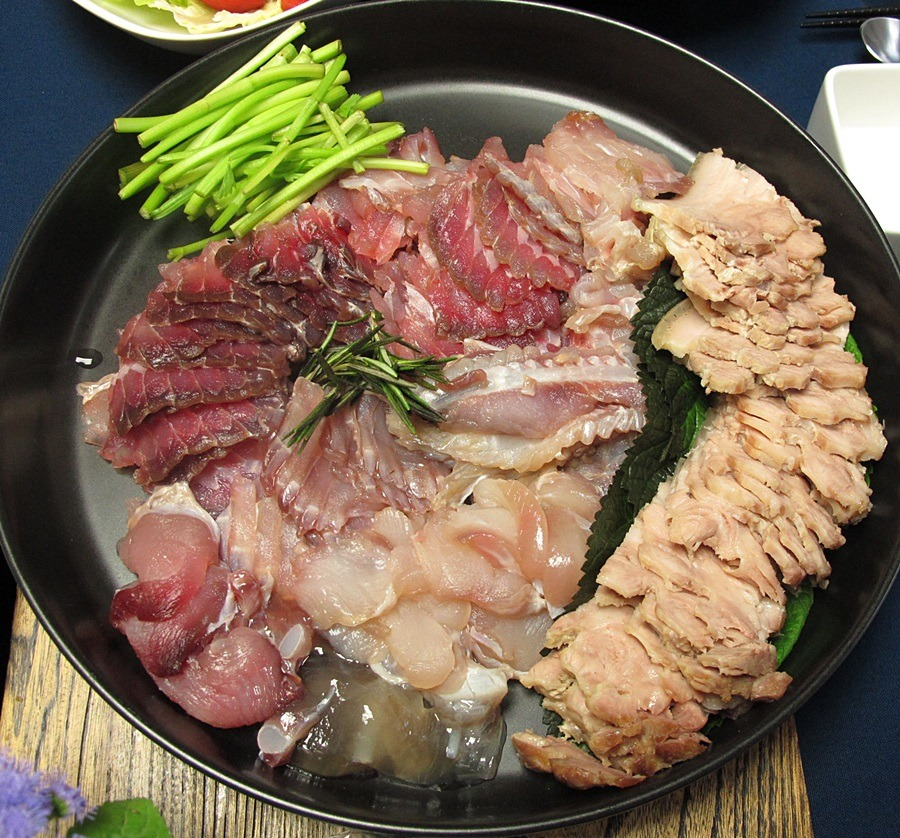
Hongeo-hoe, a Korean dish which uses fermented meat of Ocellate spot skate

Raw skate wing

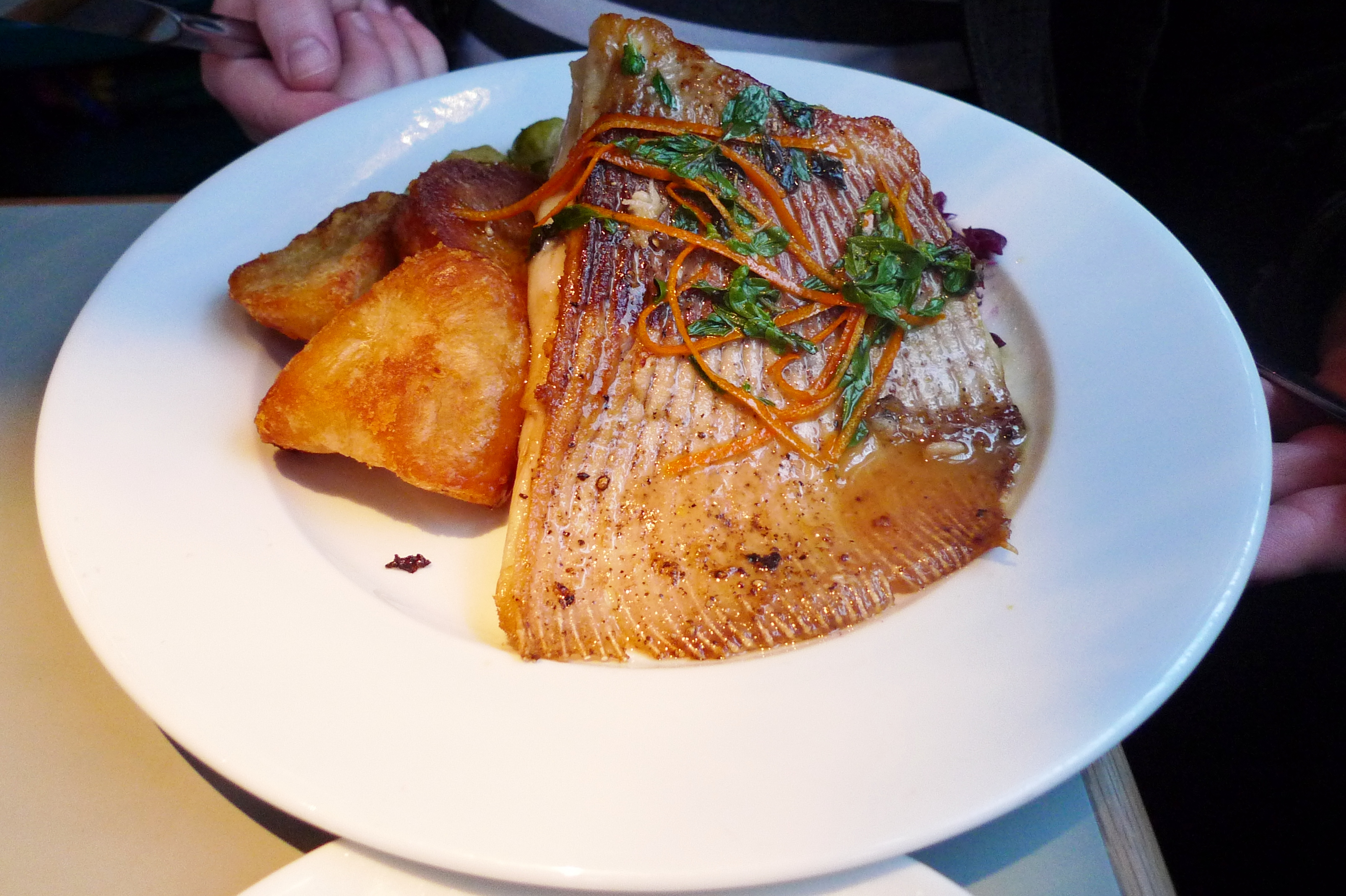
Cooked skate wing at a restaurant in London

== See also ==
- Jenny Haniver, a fake sea monster created from a skate carcass.
- Hongeohoe, a Korean dish made from fermented skate.
- Mokpo, a South Korean city famous for its skate cuisine.
