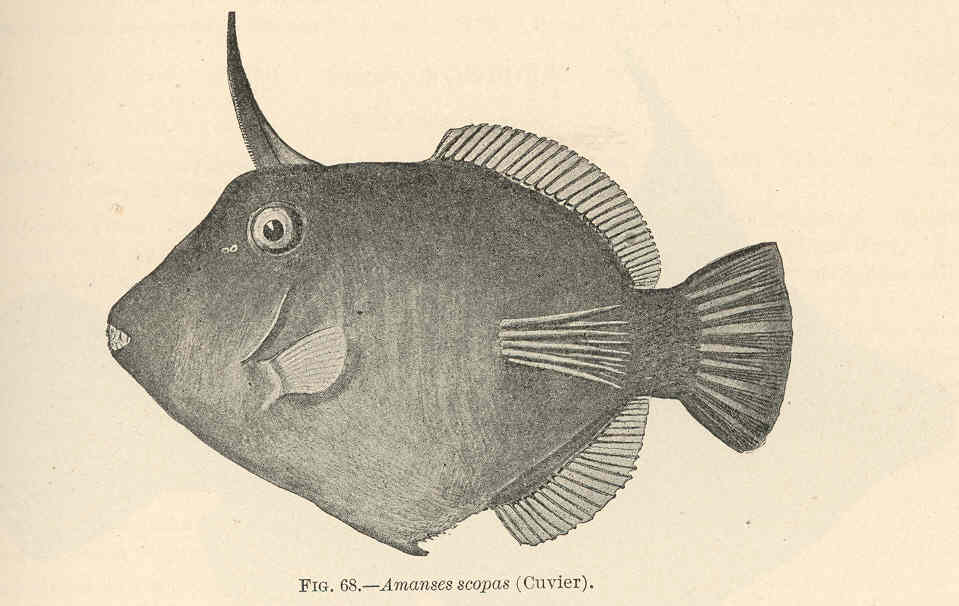

Scientific classification
- Kingdom: Animalia
- Phylum: Chordata
- Class: Actinopterygii
- Order: Tetraodontiformes
- Family: Monacanthidae
- Genus: Amanses; Gray, 1835

Synonyms
- Amnases (misspelling); Anameses misspelling - incorrect subsequent spelling; Anamses (misspelling); Trichoderma (subgenus of Monocanthus) Swainson, 1839

= Amanses =

Genus of fish

Amanses is a genus of filefish, with one extant species.

== Species ==
- Amanses scopas Cuvier, 1835
- †Amanses sulcifer Casier, 1966

The extant species is found in the Indo-Pacific, and the fossil species was described from an otolith from London clay formations.

Synonyms

- Amanses amphioxys (Cope, 1871): synonym of Cantherhines pullus (Ranzani, 1842)
- Amanses carolae (Hollard, 1854): synonym of Cantherhines dumerilii (Hollard, 1854)
- Amanses fronticinctus (Günther, 1867): synonym of Cantherhines fronticinctus (Günther, 1867)
- Amanses longipinnis Fraser-Brunner, 1941: synonym of Cantheschenia longipinnis (Fraser-Brunner, 1941)
- Amanses microlepidotus Gray, 1859: synonym of Cantherhines pardalis (Rüppell, 1837)
- Amanses pardalis (Rüppell, 1837) synonym of Cantherhines pardalis (Rüppell, 1837) (superseded combination)
- Amanses pullus (Ranzani, 1842): synonym of Cantherhines pullus (Ranzani, 1842)
- Amanses rapanui de Buen, 1963: synonym of Cantherhines rapanui (de Buen, 1963)
- Amanses sandwichiensis (Quoy & Gaimard, 1824): synonym of Cantherhines sandwichiensis (Quoy & Gaimard, 1824)
- Amanses striatus Kotthaus, 1979: synonym of Thamnaconus striatus (Kotthaus, 1979)
