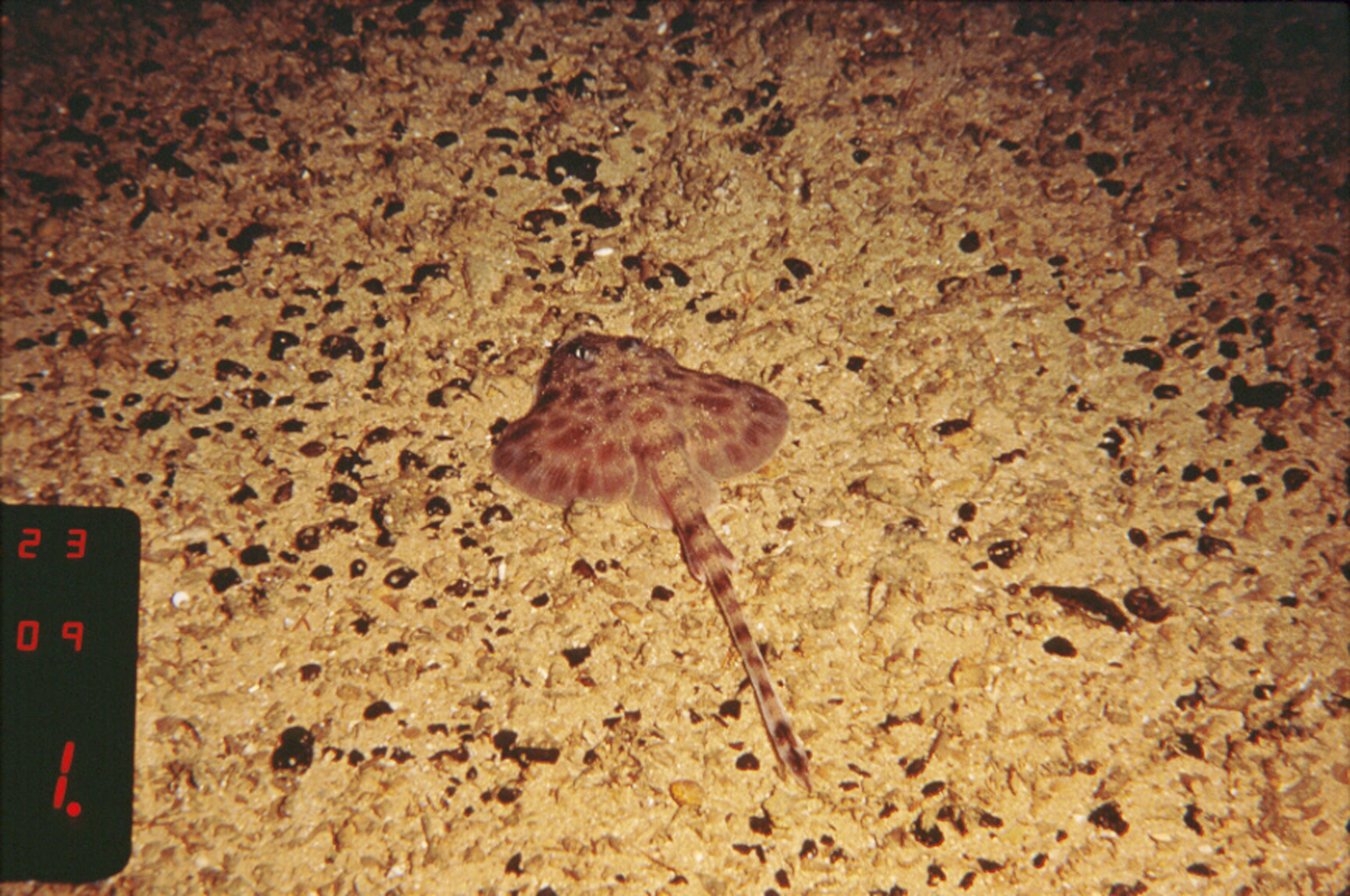

Conservation status
- Least Concern (IUCN 3.1)

Scientific classification
- Kingdom: Animalia
- Phylum: Chordata
- Class: Chondrichthyes
- Subclass: Elasmobranchii
- Order: Rajiformes
- Family: Gurgesiellidae
- Genus: Fenestraja
- Species: F. plutonia

Binomial name
- Fenestraja plutonia (Garman, 1881)

Synonyms
- Breviraja plutonia (Garman, 1881); Gurgesiella plutonia (Garman, 1881); Raja acanthiderma(?) (Fowler, 1947); Raja plutonia (Garman, 1881)

= Fenestraja plutonia =

Species of cartilaginous fish

Fenestraja plutonia is a species of cartilaginous fish in the family Gurgesiellidae. It is commonly known as the underworld windowskate or the Pluto pygmy skate. The underworld windowskate is known from patches of continental slope in the western Atlantic Ocean between the coasts of the southern United States and Suriname.

== Etymology ==
The underworld windowskate's genus name, Fenestraja, comes from a combination of two words. Fenestre is a Latin word meaning window, which in this case refers to a small opening in bone. A second Latin word, Raja simply refers to the genus as a skate/ray of the family Rajidae. Its species name is a reference to Pluto (Ancient Greek: Πλούτων, Ploutōn) the Greek god of the underworld.

== Taxonomy ==
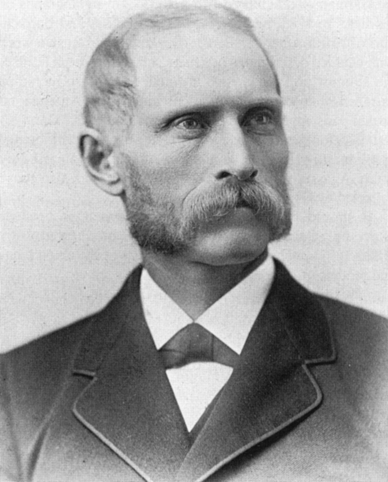
Samuel Garman

The underworld windowskate was initially described by Samuel Garman in 1881 as Raja plutoni. Garman also considered placing the species in other genera such as Breviraja and Gurgesiella. The first specimens had been caught during dredging of the Atlantic coast during the summer of the previous year. In 1947, another skate from the Gulf Stream was described by Henry Fowler as Raja acanthiderma. However this species designation has been suggested to be a synonym for the underworld windowskate, once the species was officially moved from Raja to Fenestraja.

== Description ==
The underworld windowskate has a heart-shaped disc, with denticles on the blunt snout, around the eyes, on the pectoral fins and down the sides of the long tail. It is generally yellowish, grayish, or purplish brown on top, with dark spots. The ventral surface is yellow-white, and the tail has several dark bands.

== Distribution and habitat ==
According to the IUCN, five populations of the underworld windowskate are known, all from the western Atlantic Ocean. The northernmost ranges on the North American continental shelf from North Carolina to Key West, including the Straights of Florida. Another population is known from the waters around Andros Island in the Bahamas and in the Tongue of the Ocean. A third area of continental shelf, this time in the Gulf of Mexico from the Chattahoochee River delta to the Mississippi River Delta is also known to contain the species. Finally, two widely separated groups occupy the southern Caribbean Sea, the first off Costa Rica, near Puerto Limon, and the second from the South American continental shelf near Caracas, Venezuela, to Paramaribo, Suriname.

Outside of these general ranges, specimens have been collected from the waters off Colombia, Ellesmere Island, in the eastern Gulf of Mexico, and James Bay, Canada. Individuals have also been spotted by divers in southern Mexico, and in 1891 a specimen supposedly belonging to F. plutonia was collected from the California coast, even though the underworld windowskate is overwhelmingly an Atlantic species.

== See also ==
- Fenestraja
