= Dusky finless skate =

Conservation status
- Least Concern (IUCN 3.1)

Scientific classification
- Kingdom: Animalia
- Phylum: Chordata
- Class: Chondrichthyes
- Subclass: Elasmobranchii
- Order: Rajiformes
- Family: Gurgesiellidae
- Genus: Gurgesiella
- Species: G. furvescens

Binomial name
- Gurgesiella furvescens F. de Buen, 1959

Species of fish

The dusky finless skate (Gurgesiella furvescens) is a species of fish in the family Gurgesiellidae. It is found in the western Pacific Ocean off Chile, Ecuador, and Peru. Its natural habitat is open seas along the continental slope, insular slopes, notably of the Galápagos Islands, and the outer continental shelf to a depth of 960 metres (3,150 ft).
