= Whitespotted filefish =

Whitespotted filefish is a common name for several fishes and may refer to:

- Cantherhines dumerilii, native to the Indian and Pacific Oceans
- Cantherhines macrocerus, native to the Atlantic Ocean
