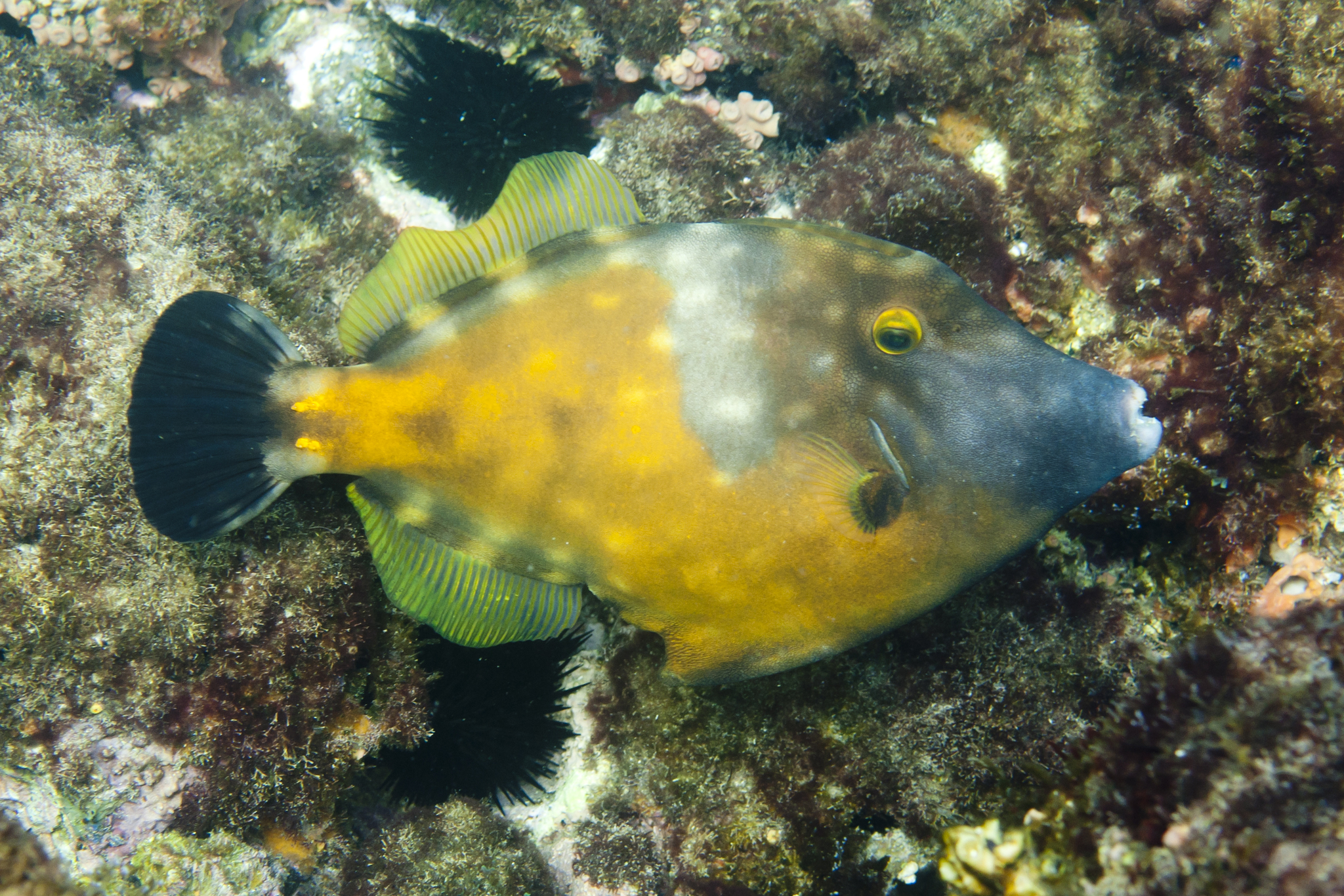
- Cantherhines macrocerus

Scientific classification
- Kingdom: Animalia
- Phylum: Chordata
- Class: Actinopterygii
- Order: Tetraodontiformes
- Family: Monacanthidae
- Genus: Cantherhines; Swainson, 1839

= Cantherhines =

Genus of fishes

Cantherhines is a genus of filefishes.

== Species ==
There are currently 11 recognized species in this genus:

Species	Common name	Image
Cantherhines cerinus J. E. Randall, 2011		
Cantherhines dumerilii Hollard, 1854	whitespotted filefish	
Cantherhines fronticinctus Günther, 1867	spectacled filefish	
Cantherhines longicaudus Hutchins & J. E. Randall, 1982		
Cantherhines macrocerus Hollard, 1853	American whitespotted filefish	
Cantherhines nukuhiva J. E. Randall, 2011		
Cantherhines pardalis Rüppell, 1837	honeycomb filefish	
Cantherhines pullus Ranzani, 1842	orange-spotted filefish	
Cantherhines rapanui F. de Buen, 1963	Rapanui filefish	
Cantherhines sandwichiensis Quoy & Gaimard, 1824	Sandwich Isle file	
Cantherhines verecundus E. K. Jordan, 1925	shy filefish	
