= Onefin skate =

Conservation status
- Vulnerable (IUCN 3.1)

Scientific classification
- Kingdom: Animalia
- Phylum: Chordata
- Class: Chondrichthyes
- Subclass: Elasmobranchii
- Order: Rajiformes
- Family: Gurgesiellidae
- Genus: Gurgesiella
- Species: G. dorsalifera

Binomial name
- Gurgesiella dorsalifera McEachran & Compagno, 1980

Species of fish

The onefin skate (Gurgesiella dorsalifera) is a species of fish in the family Gurgesiellidae. It is endemic to Brazil. Its natural habitat is open seas, specifically on the bottom along the continental slope between 400 and 800 metres (1,300 and 2,600 ft) deep. It is a bycatch of fishing boats targeting shrimp and Argentine squid (Illex argentinus), which has contributed to significant population declines among G. dorsalifera.
