= Gurgesiella atlantica =

Conservation status
- Least Concern (IUCN 3.1)

Scientific classification
- Kingdom: Animalia
- Phylum: Chordata
- Class: Chondrichthyes
- Subclass: Elasmobranchii
- Order: Rajiformes
- Family: Gurgesiellidae
- Genus: Gurgesiella
- Species: G. atlantica

Binomial name
- Gurgesiella atlantica Bigelow & Schroeder, 1962

Species of cartilaginous fish

Gurgesiella atlantica, commonly known as the Atlantic pygmy skate, Atlantic finless skate, or simply the Atlantic skate, is a skate species in the family Gurgesiellidae. It lives in the western central and southwest Atlantic Ocean, from Nicaragua to Brazil. It grows to 49 centimetres (19 in) – 52 centimetres (20 in) long and is distinguished from other skates by its long, slender tail and absence of dorsal fins.

== Description ==
The Atlantic pygmy skate has a width of 19.6 centimetres (7.7 in) and grows to a total length of about 49 centimetres (19 in) – 52 centimetres (20 in), with the exact length varying slightly between different sources. In comparison to other skates, it is medium in size. The species' upperbody is pale brown in color, sometimes containing spots, and its underside is brownish pink. It has a darker tail, typically a dark shade of brown, and a black caudal fin.

The species' tail is extremely long and slender for a skate and is completely absent of dorsal fins; these factors make the species easily distinguishable from other skate species in the area. It has a large number of denticles on its dorsal disc, completely covering it. Male specimens have thorns on their anterior disk as adults and females have them in the middle of their tail and disc. In addition, males adults have claspers, which are thin and long. It has a number of other notable characteristics as well, including a long caudal fin, long pelvic fines, large eyes, a short snout, and an arched mouth.

== Behavior and habitat ==
The Atlantic pygmy skate exhibits oviparity, laying its eggs in pairs. Young obtain their nutrients through yolk as embryos. The shells on the species' eggs contain projections in the shape of horns. It is a demersal fish, living at the bottom of the sea floor. According to the International Union for Conservation of Nature (IUCN) it is found in waters 247 metres (810 ft) – 960 metres (3,150 ft) in depth, although FishBase states that it has a much more restricted range of 374 metres (1,227 ft) – 480 metres (1,570 ft).

== Distribution ==
The Atlantic pygmy skate lives in the Atlantic Ocean, with its distribution ranging as far north as Nicaragua and as far south as northern Brazil. In total, it covers the countries of Bolivia, Brazil, Colombia, Costa Rica, Nicaragua, Panama, and Venezuela. The species is bathydemersal and lives on the continental slope. Little is known about the species' population and threats; therefore, no conservation actions are currently taking place for the species. It is listed as least concern by IUCN.
