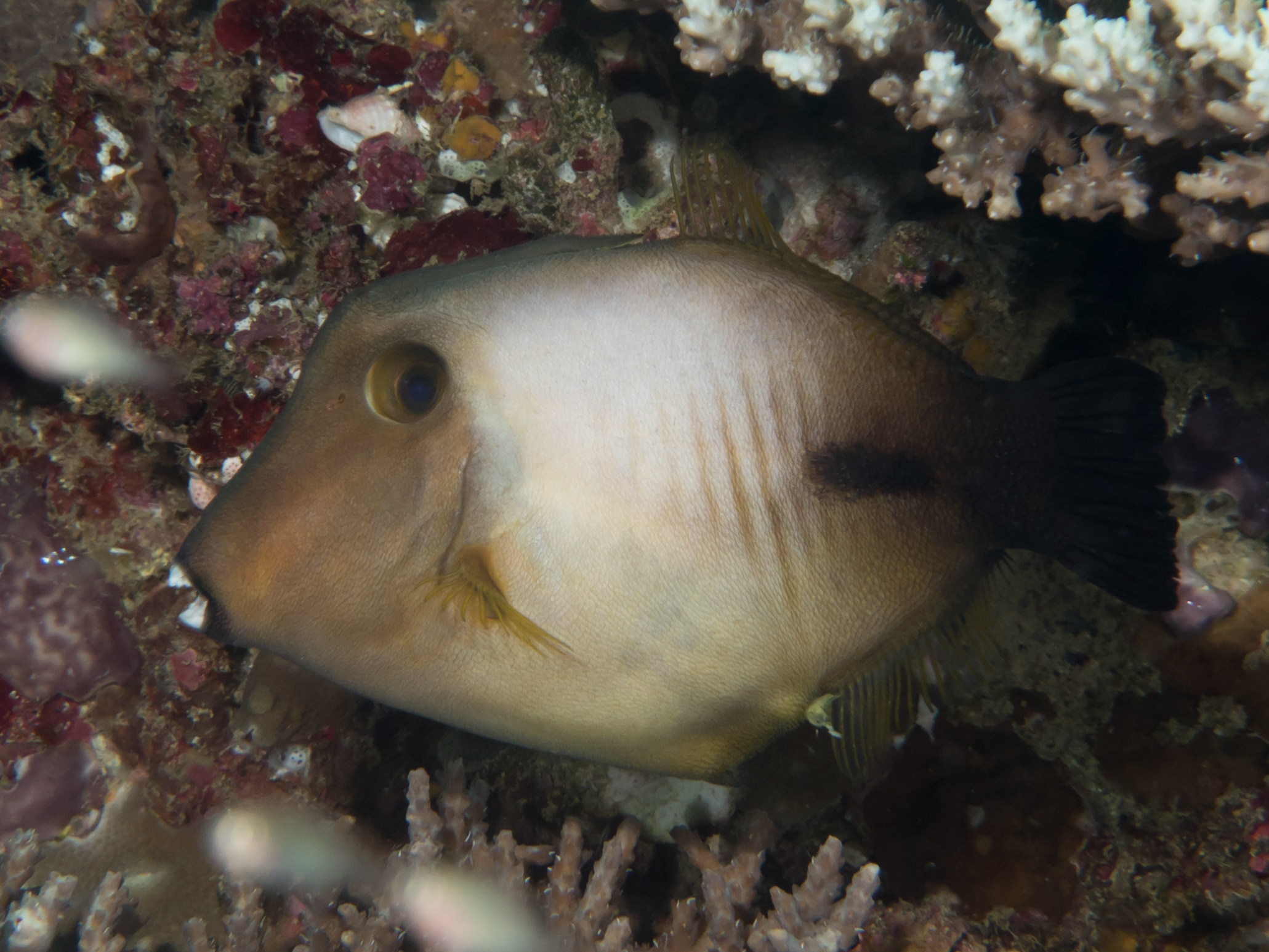

Conservation status
- Least Concern (IUCN 3.1)

Scientific classification
- Kingdom: Animalia
- Phylum: Chordata
- Class: Actinopterygii
- Order: Tetraodontiformes
- Family: Monacanthidae
- Genus: Amanses
- Species: A. scopas

Binomial name
- Amanses scopas (G. Cuvier, 1829)

Synonyms
- Amnases scopas (Cuvier, 1829) · isspelling); Anameses scopas (Cuvier, 1829) misspelling - incorrect subsequent spelling; Anamses scopas (Cuvier, 1829) (misspelling); Balistes scopas Cuvier, 1829; Monacanthus hystrix Burton, 1835; Thamnaconus penicularius Fourmanoir in Roux-Estève & Fourmanoir, 1955

= Broom filefish =

Species of fish

Amanses scopas, also known as the broom filefish, is a filefish, the only extant species in the genus Amanses of the family Monacanthidae. It is also called brush-sided leatherjacket in Australia or broom leatherjacket in Christmas Island.

The broom filefish is a harmless tropical reef fish from the Red Sea and the Indo-Pacific oceans, growing to a length of 20 cm (7.9 in). The body is brown with up to 12 narrow dark brown crossbars, the caudal fin is dark brown, and the soft dorsal, anal and pectoral fins are pale. Males have numerous long spines in front of the caudal peduncle, and females similarly have a toothbrush-like mass of setae in the same location.

They occur in areas of mixed sand, rubble, and coral heads of semi-protected seaward reefs.

== Gallery ==
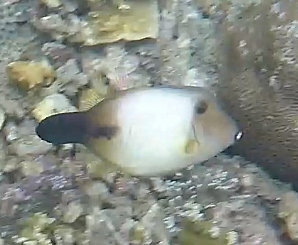
In Indonesia

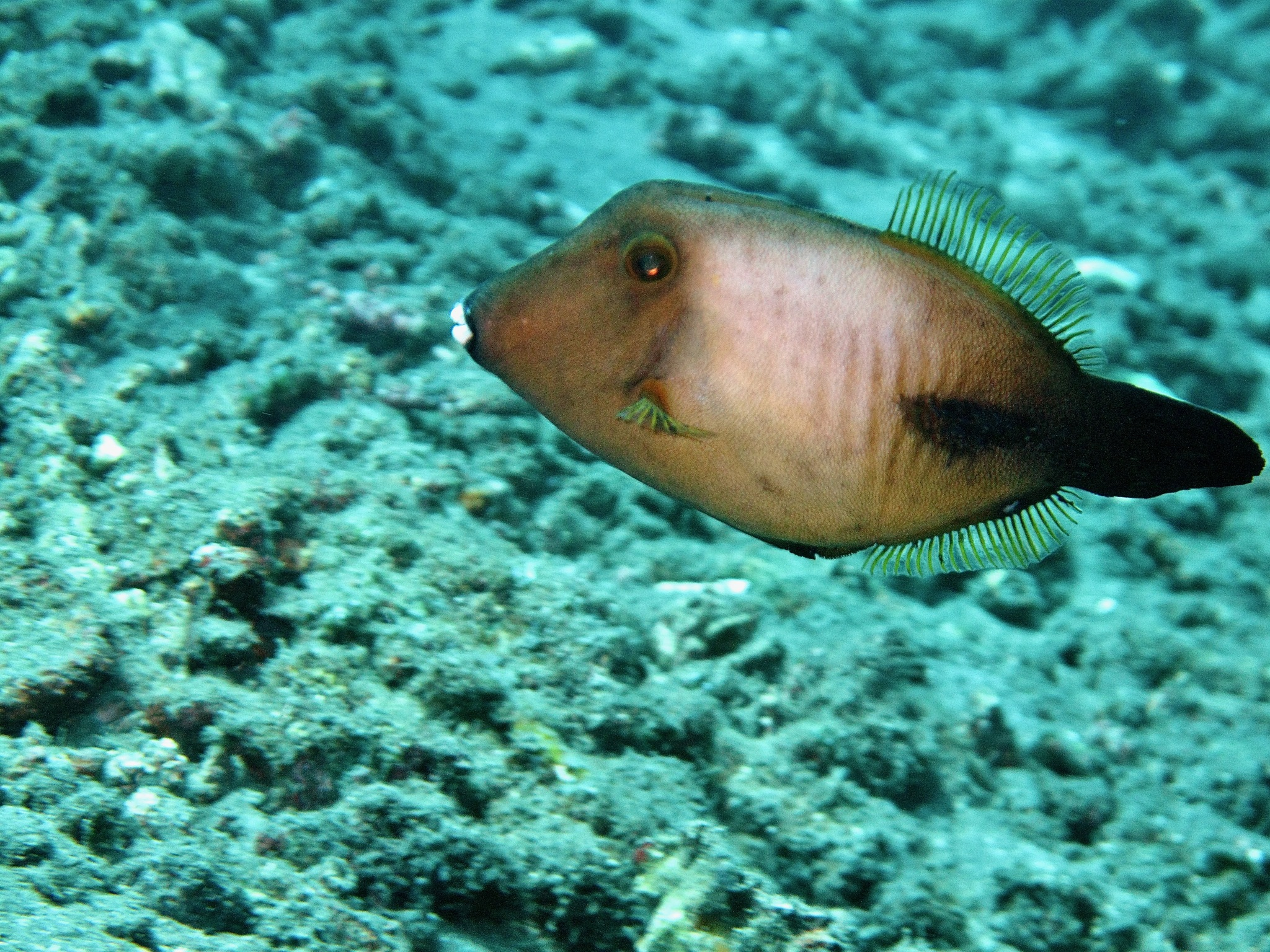
In Indonesia

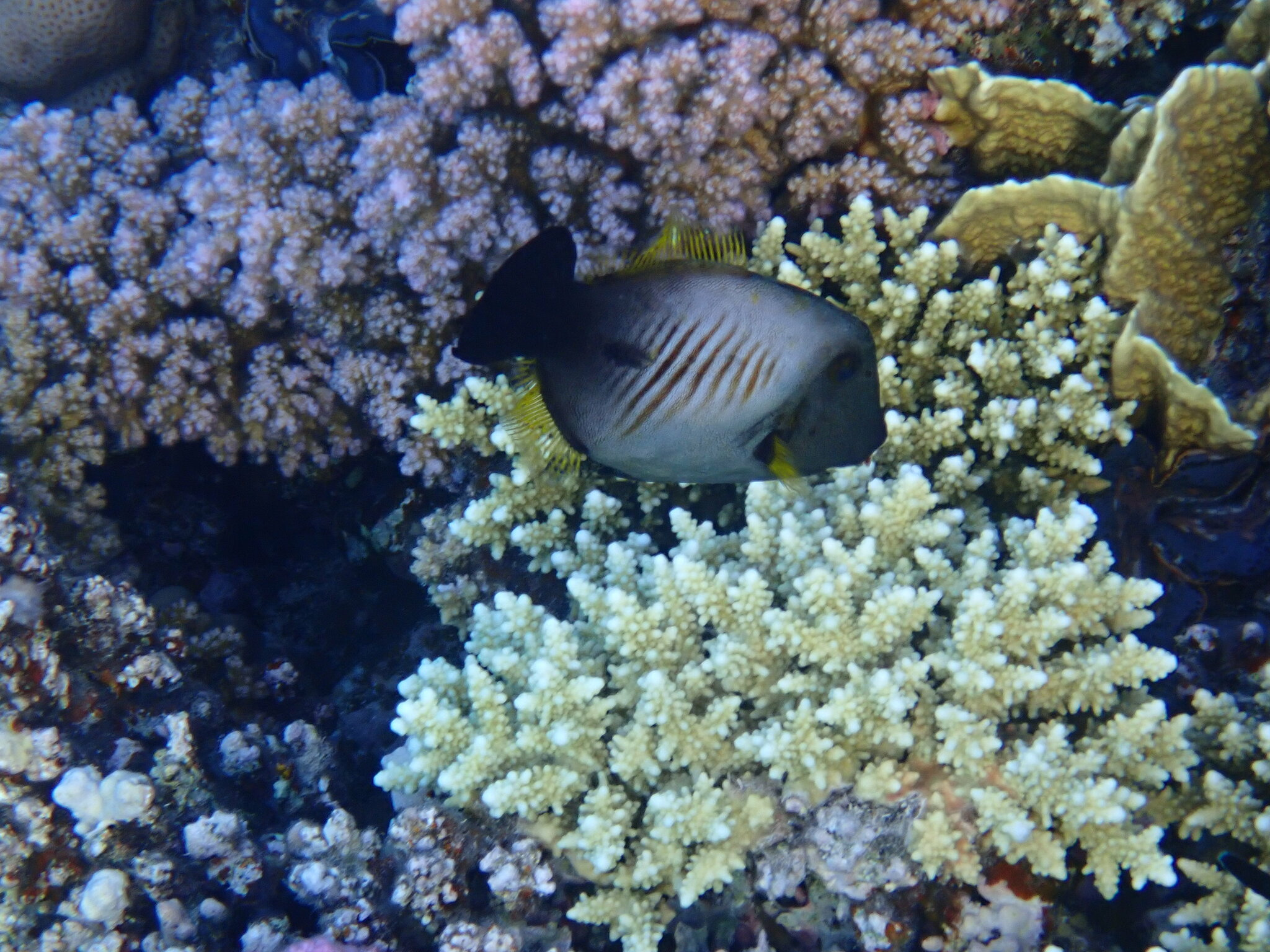
In the Red Sea

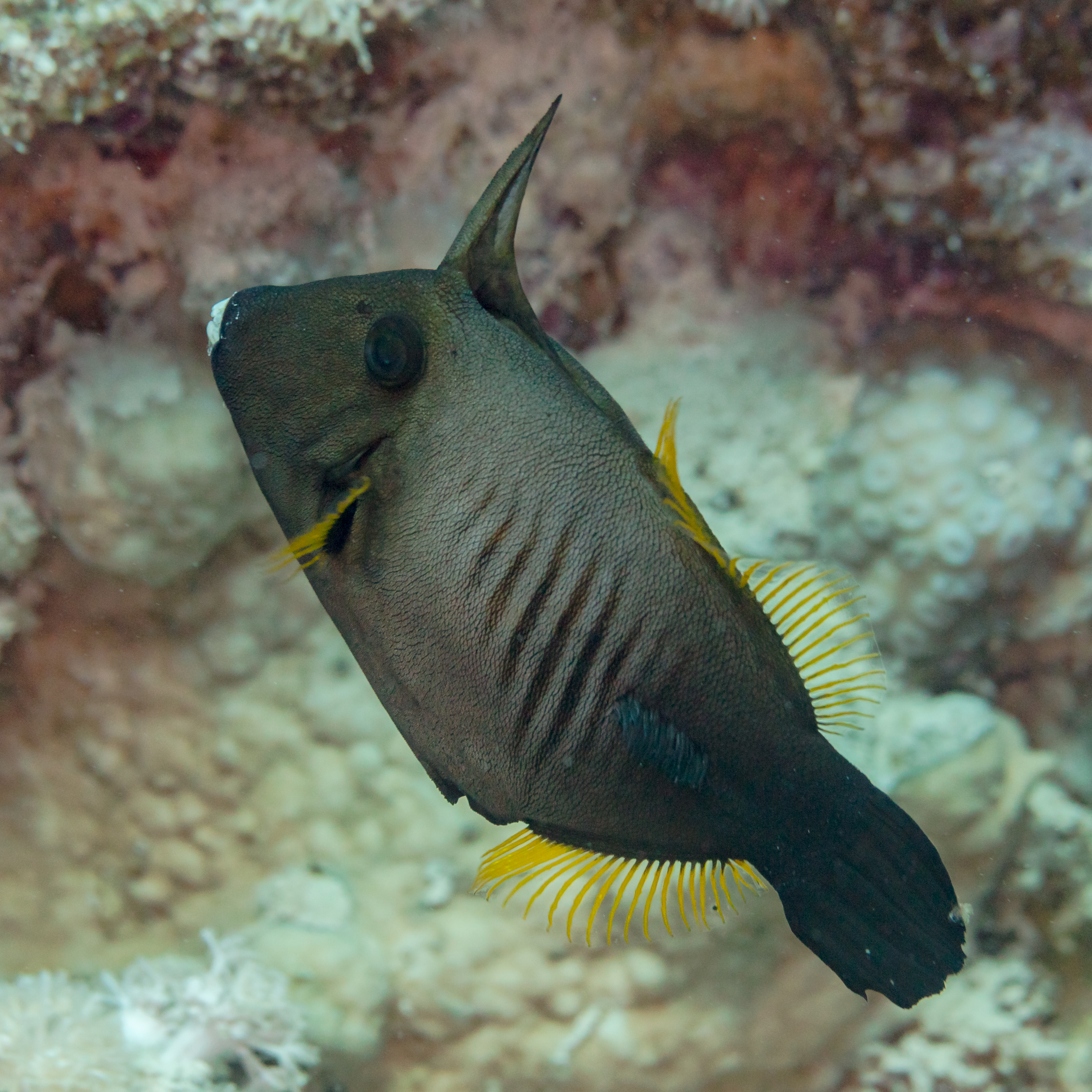
With extended dorsal spine
