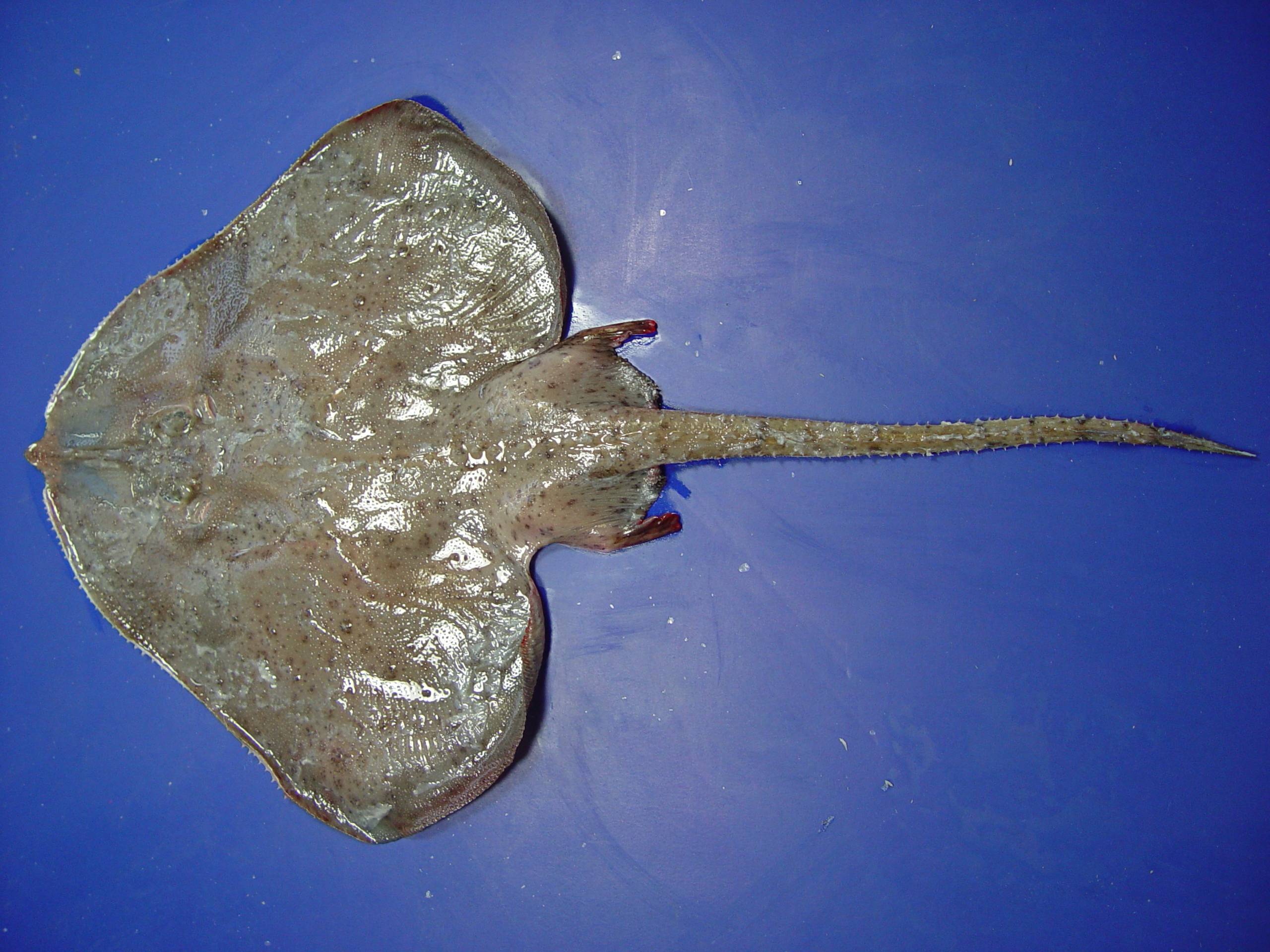

Conservation status
- Least Concern (IUCN 3.1)

Scientific classification
- Kingdom: Animalia
- Phylum: Chordata
- Class: Chondrichthyes
- Subclass: Elasmobranchii
- Order: Rajiformes
- Family: Rajidae
- Genus: Breviraja
- Species: B. spinosa

Binomial name
- Breviraja spinosa Bigelow & Schroeder, 1950

= Breviraja spinosa =

Species of cartilaginous fish

Breviraja spinosa, commonly known as the spinose skate, is a species of ray in the family Rajidae.
