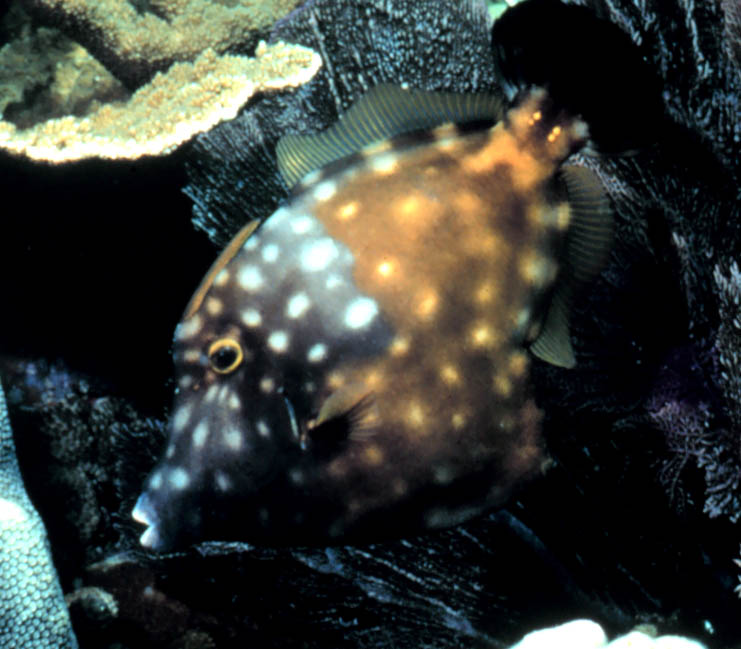
- American whitespotted filefish, Cantherhines macrocerus

Conservation status
- Least Concern (IUCN 3.1)

Scientific classification
- Kingdom: Animalia
- Phylum: Chordata
- Class: Actinopterygii
- Division: Teleostei
- Order: Tetraodontiformes
- Family: Monacanthidae
- Genus: Cantherhines
- Species: C. macrocerus

Binomial name
- Cantherhines macrocerus (Hollard, 1853)

= Cantherhines macrocerus =

Species of fish

Cantherhines macrocerus, commonly known as the whitespotted filefish, American whitespotted filefish, or whitespotted limefish, is a marine fish found along the coast of Florida extending southward into the Caribbean. This species is distinct and separate from Cantherhines dumerilii, the similarly named whitespotted filefish which is found in the Indian and Pacific oceans.

== Description ==
The American whitespotted filefish typically has a brown or olive colored body, although it may also be grey. These fish can rapidly change appearance to a high contrast color pattern with a much darker background and many light colored spots. With a maximum length of around 18 inches, they are smaller than the scrawled filefish which is also found in their range. The American whitespotted filefish is often seen in pairs.

== Diet ==
These fish are omnivorous; although they eat animals like sponges, stinging coral and gorgonians, and algae.

== As aquarium fish ==
The American whitespotted filefish can be kept in large aquariums. These fish are non-aggressive, need plenty of places to hide, and will eat brine shrimp, krill and algae.

== Gallery ==
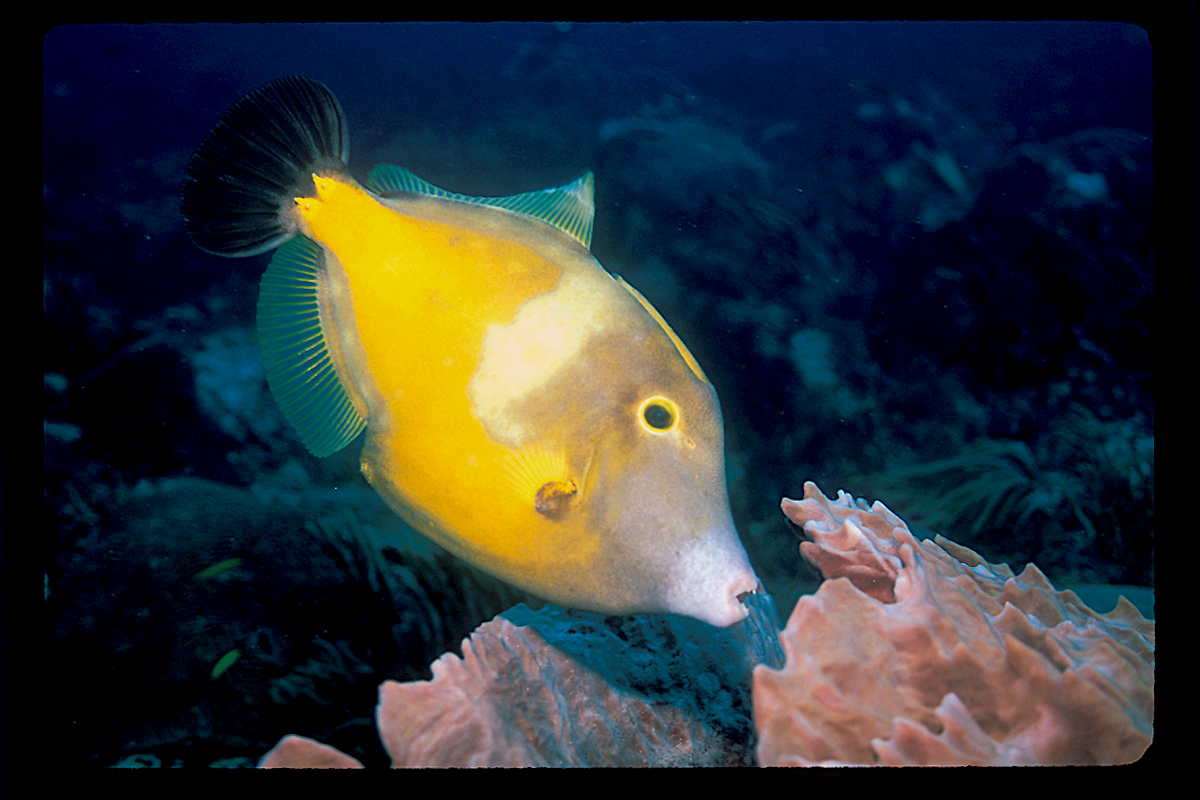

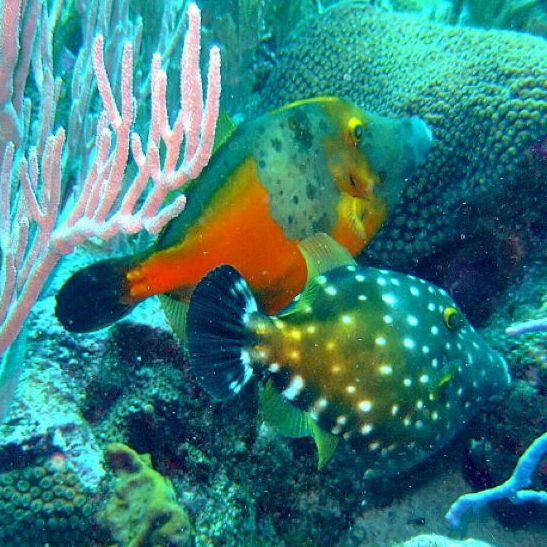
Showing two different colour patterns
