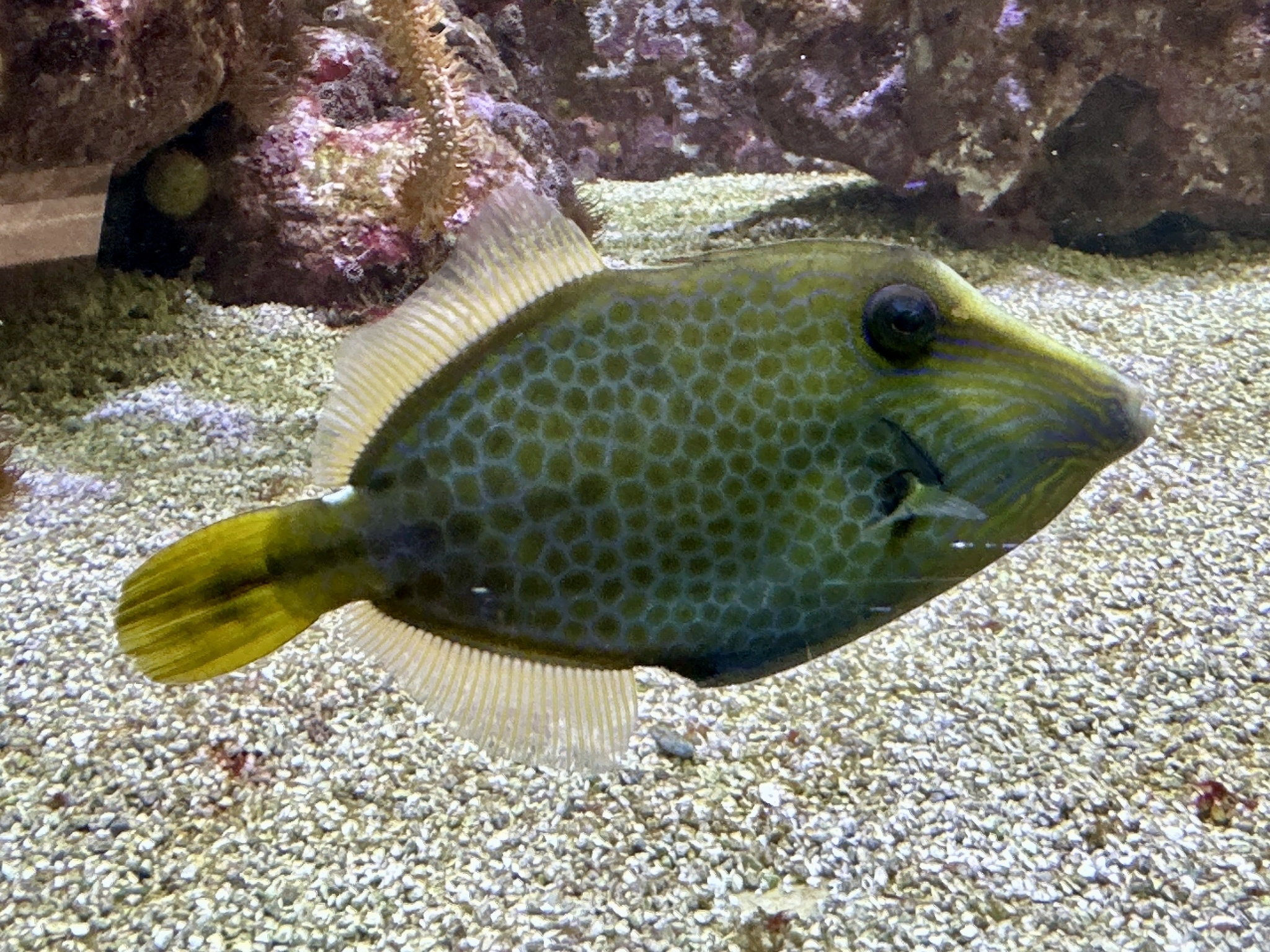

Conservation status
- Least Concern (IUCN 3.1)

Scientific classification
- Kingdom: Animalia
- Phylum: Chordata
- Class: Actinopterygii
- Order: Tetraodontiformes
- Family: Monacanthidae
- Genus: Cantherhines
- Species: C. pardalis

Binomial name
- Cantherhines pardalis (Rüppel, 1837)

Synonyms
- List: Amanses microlepidotus Gray, 1859; Cantherines pardalis (Rüppell, 1837); Hanomanctus bovinus Smith, 1949; Monacanthus aspersus Hollard, 1854; Monacanthus brunneus Castelnau, 1873; Monacanthus fatensis Seale, 1906; Monacanthus fuliginosus MacLeay, 1883; Monacanthus houttuyni Bleeker, 1854; Monacanthus kibikib Montrouzier, 1857; Monacanthus laevicaudatus Duncker & Mohr, 1929; Monacanthus melanistius Regan, 1908; Monacanthus melanuropterus Bleeker, 1853; Monacanthus natalensis Gilchrist & Thompson, 1911; Monacanthus pardalis Rüppell, 1837

= Cantherhines pardalis =

Species of fish

Cantherhines pardalis is a species of fish in the family Monacanthidae, the filefishes. Common names include honeycomb filefish, honeycomb leatherjacket, and wire-netting filefish. It is native to the Indian Ocean, the eastern Atlantic, and the western Pacific, except for the seas around Hawaii, where it is replaced by Cantherhines sandwichiensis.

== Distribution and habitat ==
This fish lives in tropical marine waters around reefs. It generally occurs at depths of up to 20 m (66 ft), sometimes venturing deeper. It is a shy and retiring fish, usually living solitarily and feeding on benthic organisms. Both juveniles and adults sometimes drift with plants and algae, including rafts of Sargassum.

== Description ==
This fish can reach 25 centimetres (9.8 in) in length, but its common length is around 15 centimetres (5.9 in). The dorsal fin is divided into two parts, the anterior one having two long, curved spines and the posterior one thirty-two to thirty-six soft rays. The first dorsal spine is located immediately above the middle of the eye and there is a deep groove in the fish's back into which the spine folds down. The anal fin has no spines and twenty-nine to thirty-two soft rays. This species has three basic color types: a uniform dark brown, a mottled grayish-brown, and gray background color with a network of fine polygonal markings. There is a prominent white spot at the base of the rear of the second dorsal fin and another at the base of the rear of the anal fins, a feature this species shares with the closely related C. pullus, found on tropical Atlantic reefs, and C. sandwichiensis from Hawaii.

== Gallery ==
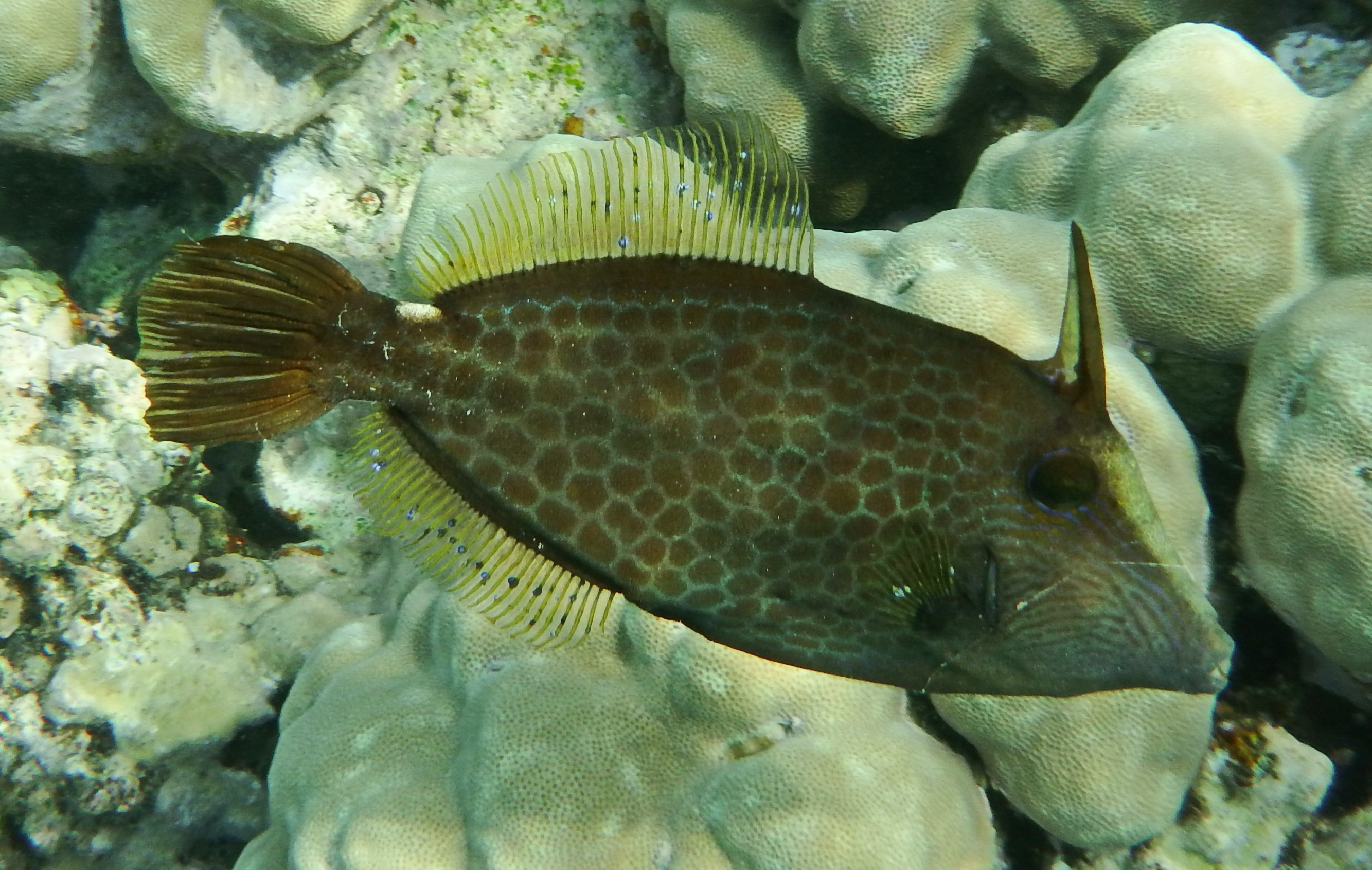
In the Red Sea

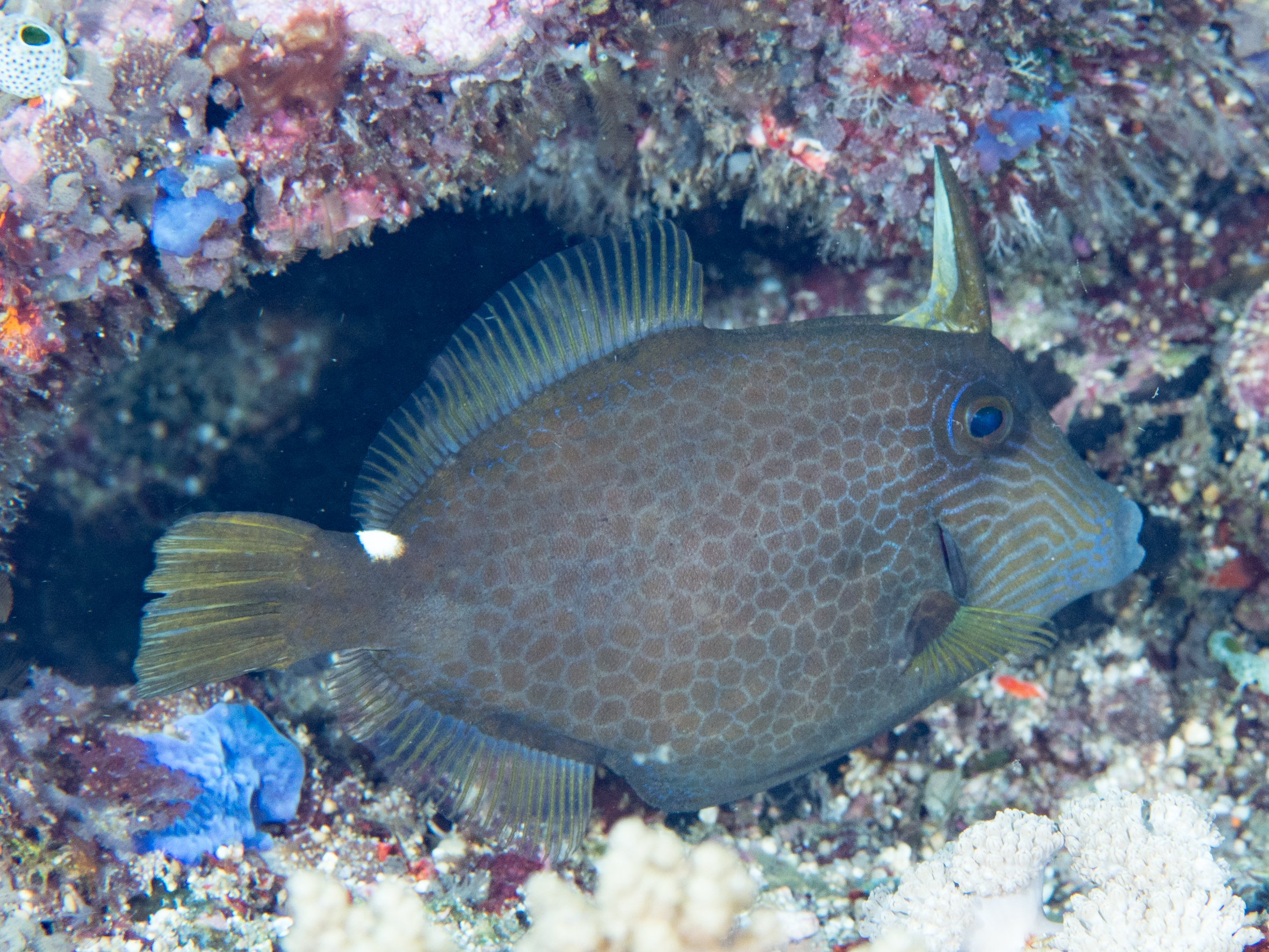
In Indonesia

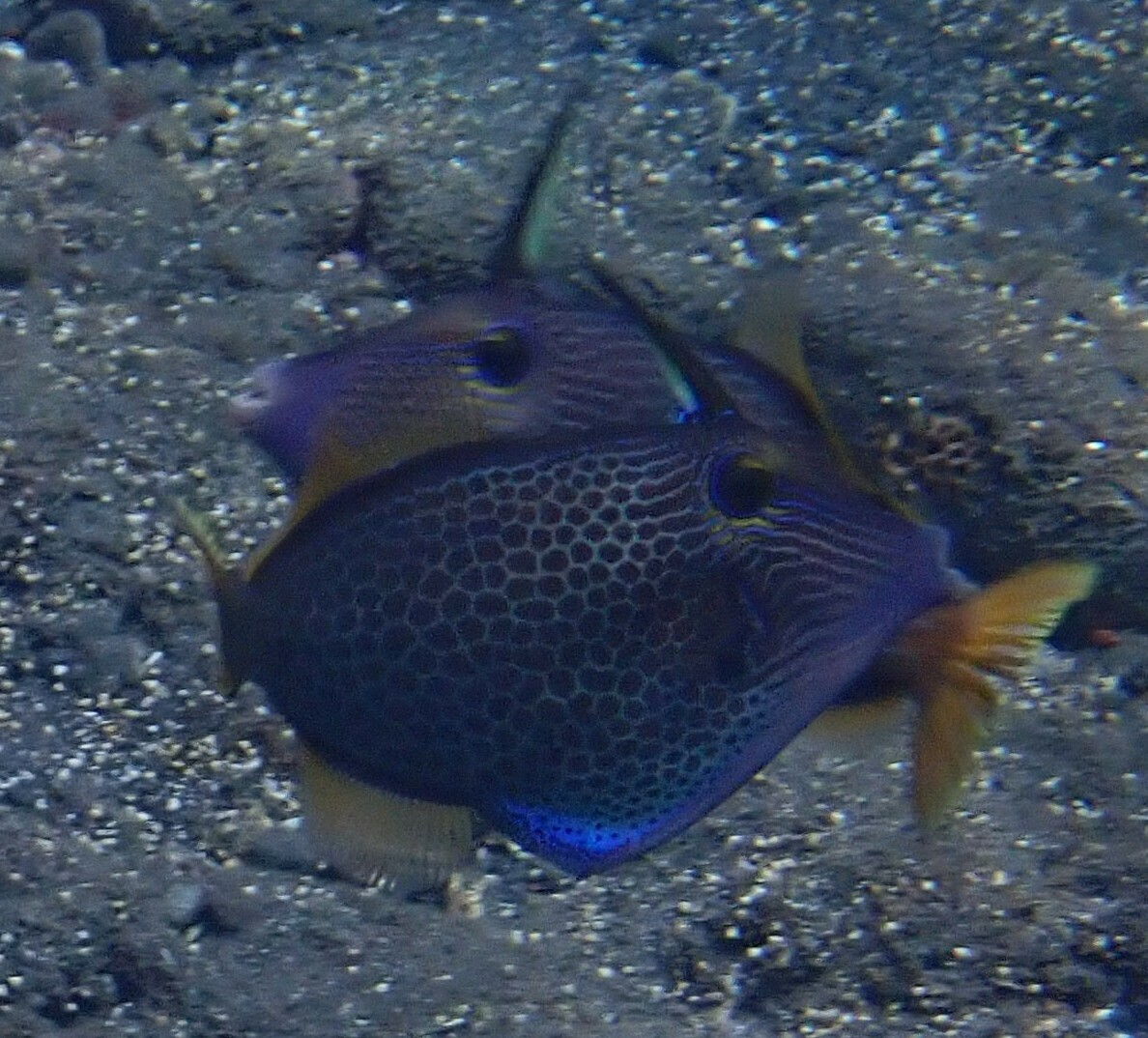
In Indonesia

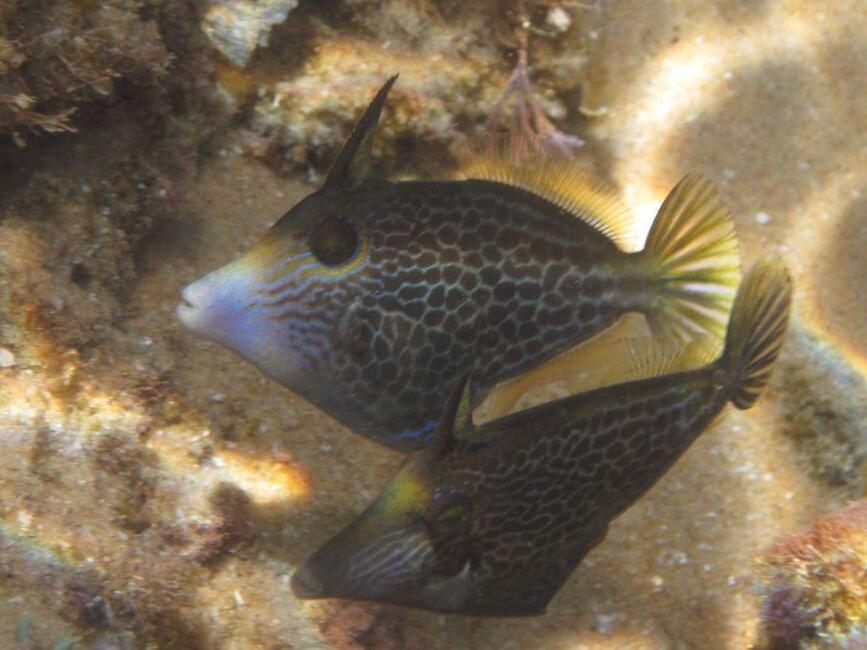
In Mozambique
