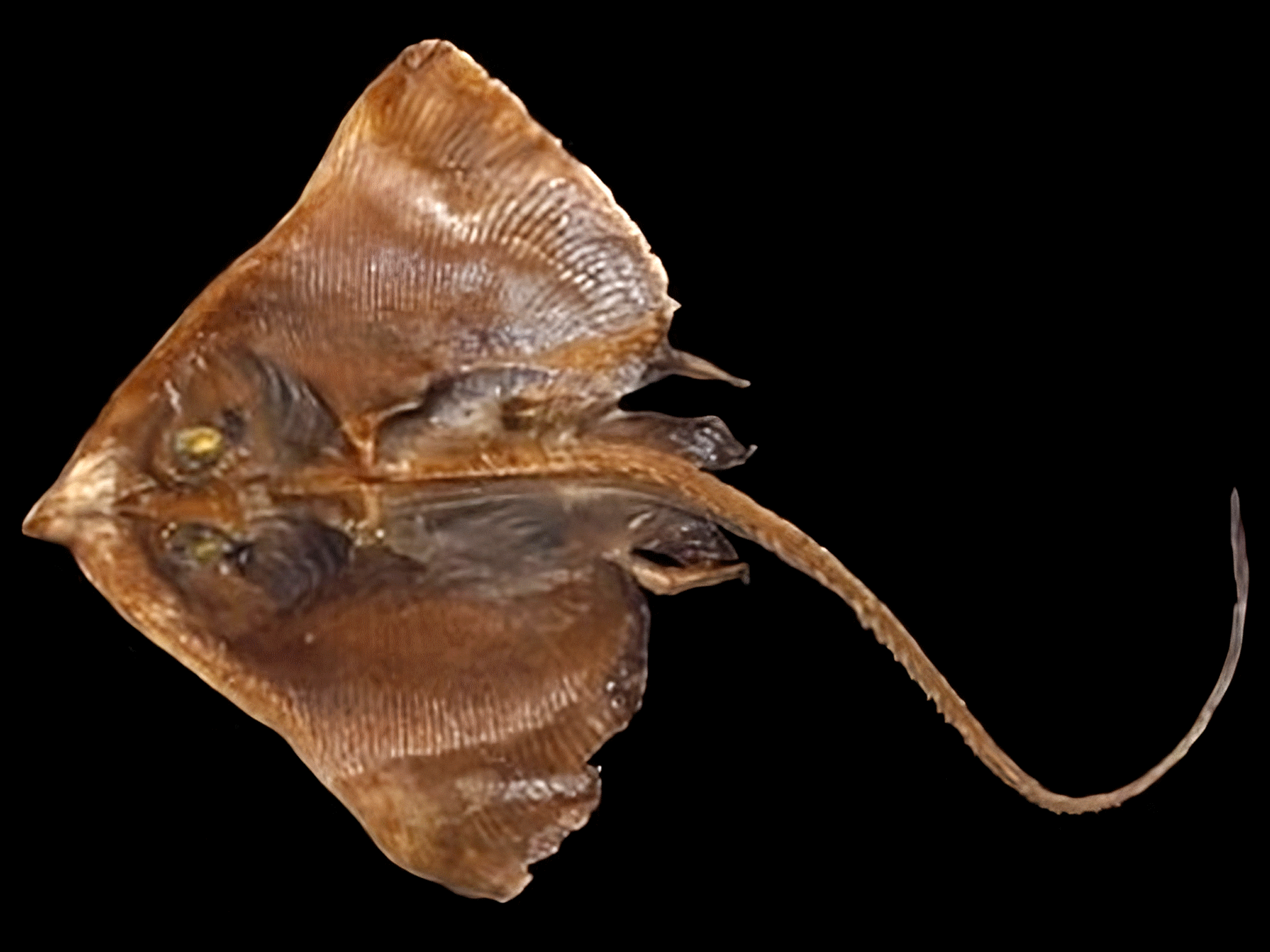
- Rough leg skate (C. rugosa)

Scientific classification
- Kingdom: Animalia
- Phylum: Chordata
- Class: Chondrichthyes
- Subclass: Elasmobranchii
- Order: Rajiformes
- Family: Gurgesiellidae
- Genus: Cruriraja; Bigelow & Schroeder, 1948

Type species
- Cruriraja atlantis Bigelow & Schroeder, 1948

= Cruriraja =

Genus of cartilaginous fishes

Cruriraja is a genus of skates in the family Gurgesiellidae. They are primarily found in the warm West Atlantic (including the Caribbean and Gulf of Mexico) and off southern Africa, but C. andamanica is from the Indian Ocean.

== Species ==
- Cruriraja andamanica (Lloyd, 1909) (Andaman leg skate)
- Cruriraja atlantis Bigelow & Schroeder, 1948 (Atlantic leg skate)
- Cruriraja cadenati Bigelow & Schroeder, 1962 (Broadfoot leg skate)
- Cruriraja durbanensis (von Bonde & Swart, 1923) (Smoothnose leg skate)
- Cruriraja hulleyi Aschliman, Ebert & Compagno, 2010
- Cruriraja parcomaculata (von Bonde & Swart, 1923) (Roughnose leg skate)
- Cruriraja poeyi Bigelow & Schroeder, 1948 (Cuban leg skate)
- Cruriraja rugosa Bigelow & Schroeder, 1958 (Rough leg skate)
