= Breviraja nigriventralis =

Conservation status
- Least Concern (IUCN 3.1)

Scientific classification
- Kingdom: Animalia
- Phylum: Chordata
- Class: Chondrichthyes
- Subclass: Elasmobranchii
- Order: Rajiformes
- Family: Rajidae
- Genus: Breviraja
- Species: B. nigriventralis

Binomial name
- Breviraja nigriventralis McEachran & Matheson, 1985

Species of cartilaginous fish

Breviraja nigriventralis, commonly known as the blackbelly skate, is a bathydemersal species of ray in the family Rajidae. It is found in the western Atlantic Ocean, in depths of 549 – 776 meters (about 1,800 - 2,550 feet). Male blackbelly skates can grow up to 40 centimetersin length.
