= Gurgesiella =

Scientific classification
- Kingdom: Animalia
- Phylum: Chordata
- Class: Chondrichthyes
- Subclass: Elasmobranchii
- Order: Rajiformes
- Family: Gurgesiellidae
- Genus: Gurgesiella; F. de Buen, 1959

Type species
- Gurgesiella furvescens de Buen, 1959

Genus of cartilaginous fishes

Gurgesiella is a genus of fish in the family Gurgesiellidae. These relatively small deep-water skates are found in the Atlantic and Pacific Oceans off South and Central America.

== Species ==
- Gurgesiella atlantica (Bigelow & Schroeder, 1962) (Atlantic pygmy skate)
- Gurgesiella dorsalifera McEachran & Compagno, 1980 (Onefin skate)
- Gurgesiella furvescens F. de Buen, 1959 (Dusky finless skate)
