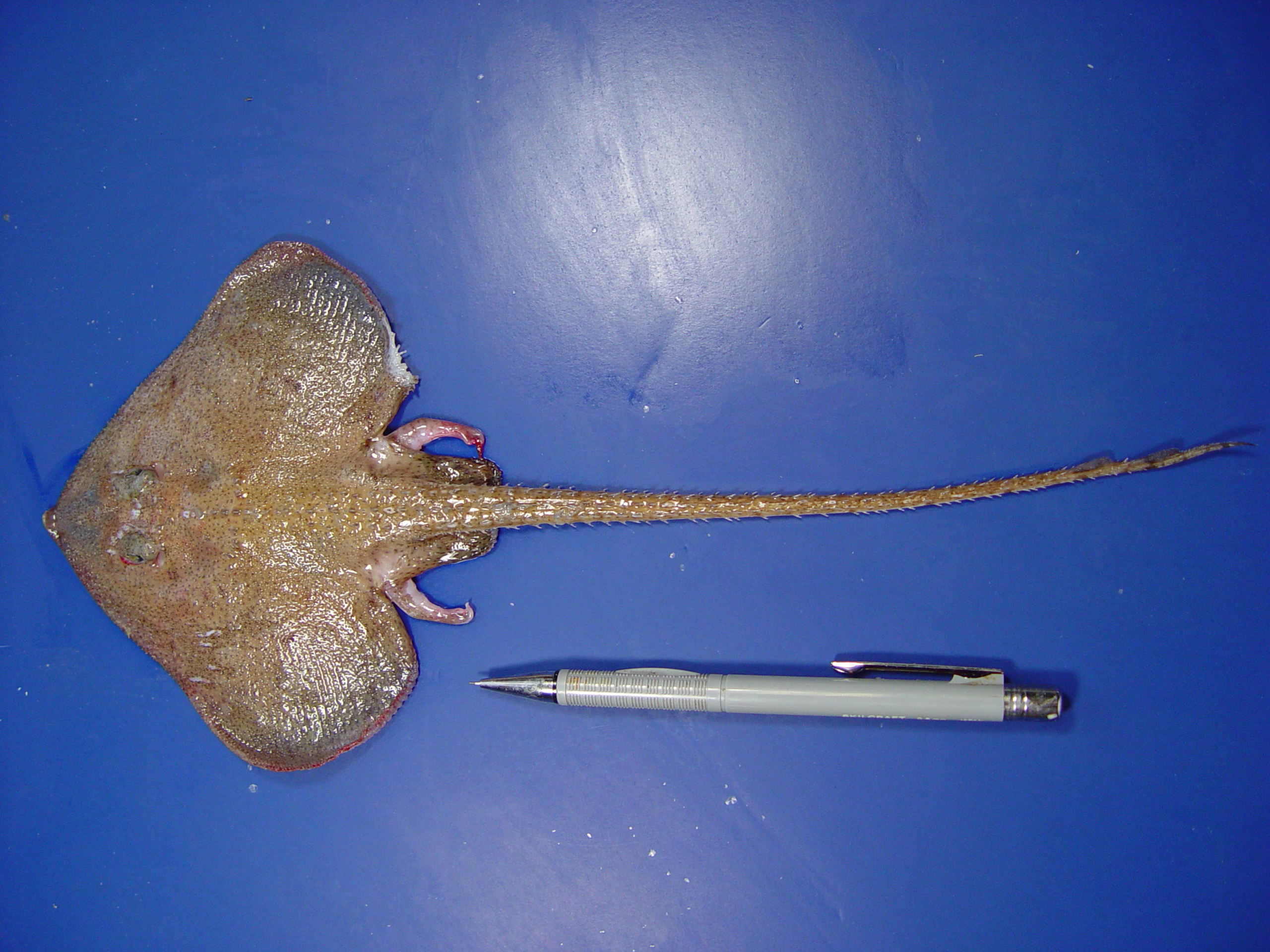
- Plain pygmy skate (Fenestraja ishiyamai)

Scientific classification
- Kingdom: Animalia
- Phylum: Chordata
- Class: Chondrichthyes
- Subclass: Elasmobranchii
- Order: Rajiformes
- Family: Gurgesiellidae
- Genus: Fenestraja; McEachran & Compagno, 1982

Type species
- Raja plutonia Garman, 1881

= Fenestraja =

Genus of cartilaginous fishes

Fenestraja is a genus of eight species of skate in the family Gurgesiellidae. They are found in deeper waters of the western Atlantic (including the Caribbean and Gulf of Mexico) and the Indian Ocean (east to Bali).

== Species ==
- Fenestraja atripinna (Bigelow & Schroeder, 1950) (Blackfin pygmy skate)
- Fenestraja cubensis (Bigelow & Schroeder, 1950) (Cuban pygmy skate)
- Fenestraja ishiyamai (Bigelow & Schroeder, 1962) (Plain pygmy skate)
- Fenestraja maceachrani (Séret, 1989) (Madagascar pygmy skate)
- Fenestraja mamillidens (Alcock, 1889) (Prickly skate)
- Fenestraja plutonia (Garman, 1881) (Pluto skate)
- Fenestraja sibogae (M. C. W. Weber, 1913) (Siboga skate)
- Fenestraja sinusmexicanus (Bigelow & Schroeder, 1950) (Gulf of Mexico pygmy skate)
