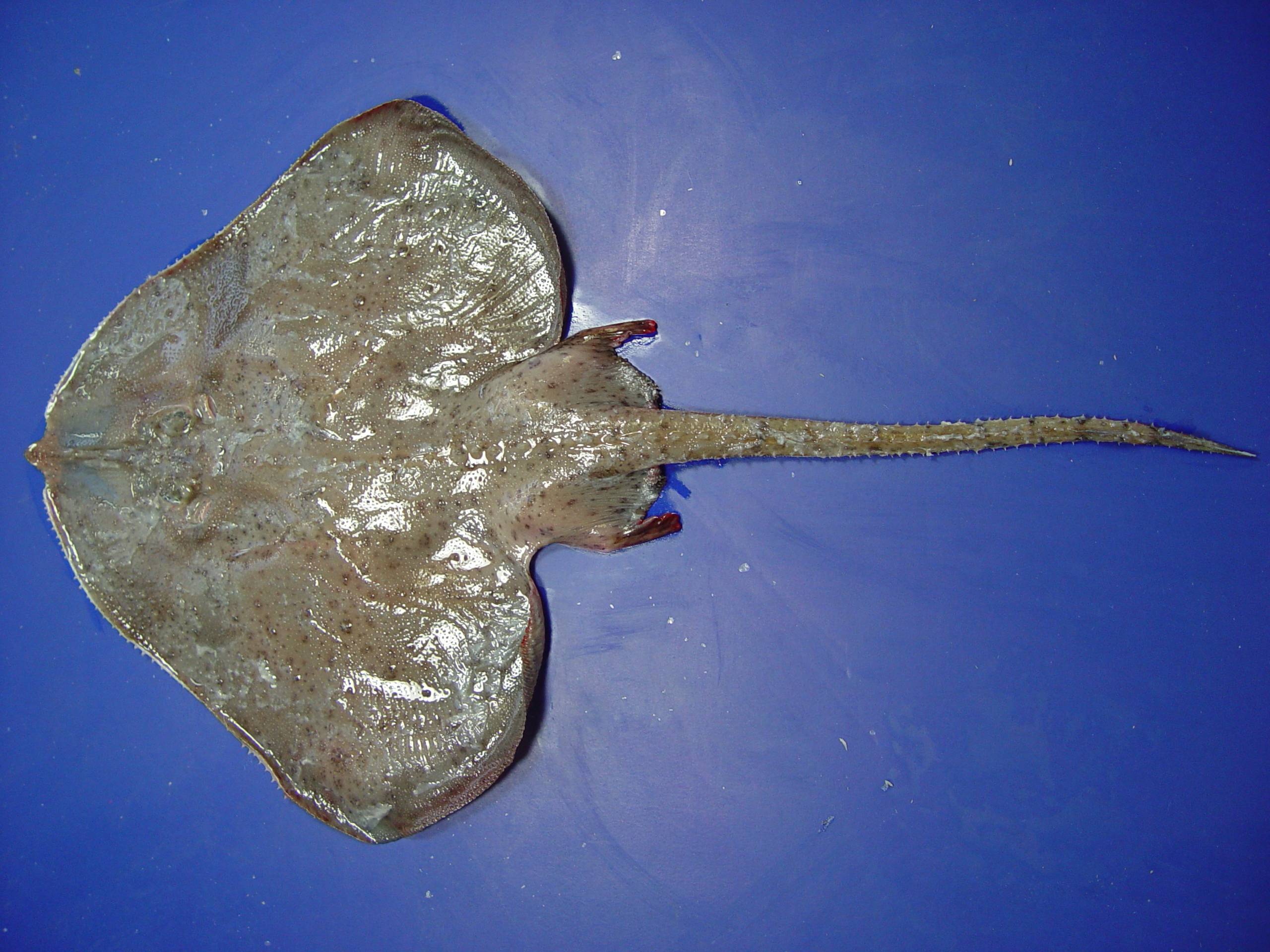

Scientific classification
- Kingdom: Animalia
- Phylum: Chordata
- Class: Chondrichthyes
- Subclass: Elasmobranchii
- Order: Rajiformes
- Family: Rajidae
- Genus: Breviraja; Bigelow & Schroeder, 1948

Type species
- Breviraja colesi Bigelow & Schroeder, 1948

= Breviraja =

Genus of cartilaginous fishes

Breviraja, commonly known as lightnose skates, is a genus of small skates in the family Rajidae. They are found in deep water of the western Atlantic, including the Gulf of Mexico.

== Species ==
- Breviraja claramaculata McEachran & Matheson, 1985 (Brightspot skate)
- Breviraja colesi Bigelow & Schroeder, 1948 (Lightnose skate)
- Breviraja mouldi McEachran & Matheson, 1995 (Blacknose Skate)
- Breviraja nigriventralis McEachran & Matheson, 1985 (Blackbelly skate)
- Breviraja spinosa Bigelow & Schroeder, 1950 (Spinose skate)
