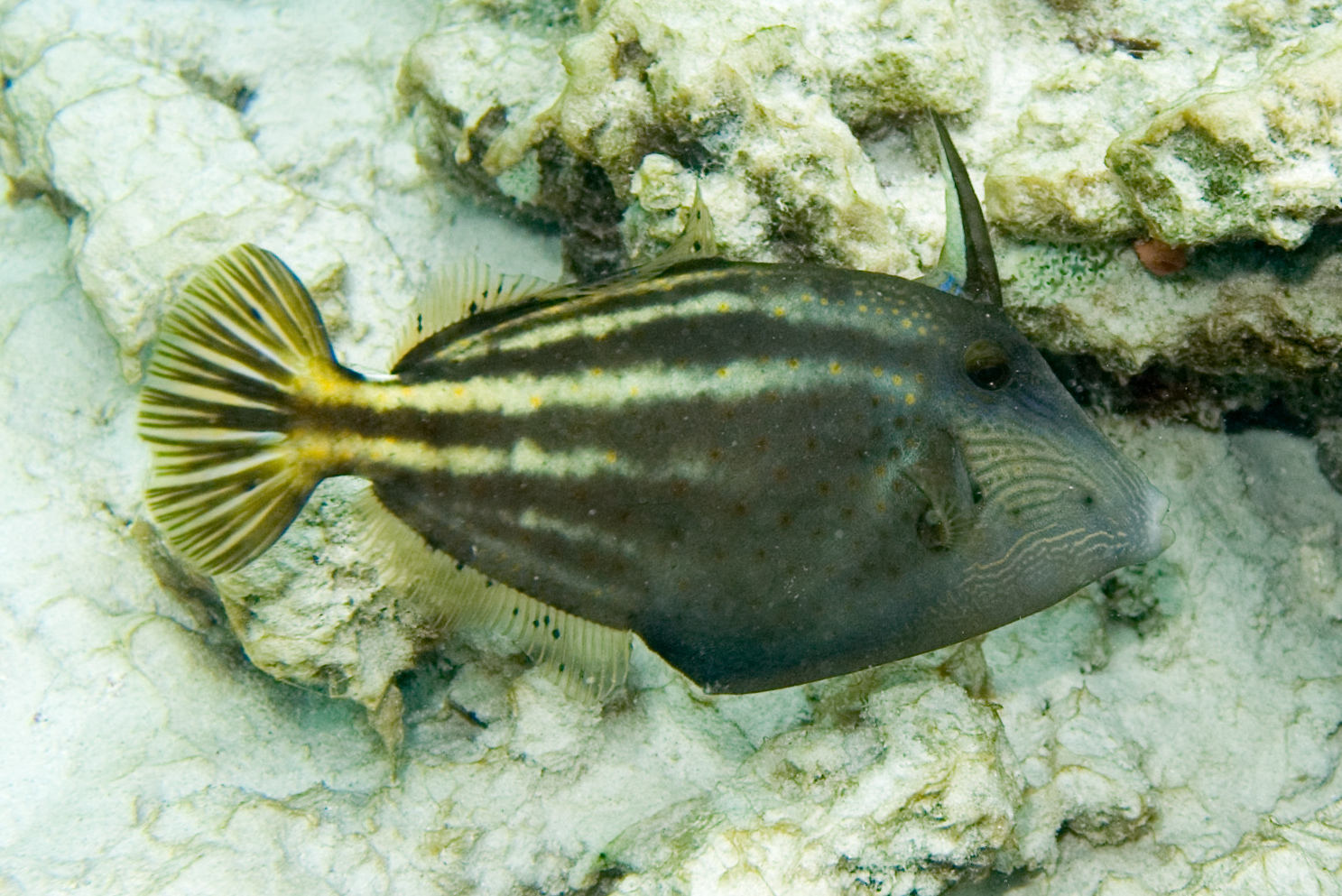

Conservation status
- Least Concern (IUCN 3.1)

Scientific classification
- Kingdom: Animalia
- Phylum: Chordata
- Class: Actinopterygii
- Order: Tetraodontiformes
- Family: Monacanthidae
- Genus: Cantherhines
- Species: C. pullus

Binomial name
- Cantherhines pullus (Ranzani, 1842)

Synonyms
- Monacanthus amphioxys Cope, 1871; Monacanthus homopterus Cope, 1871; Monacanthus irroratus Poey, 1860; Monacanthus punctatus Poey, 1868; Monacanthus pullus Ranzani, 1842; Monacanthus ruppellii Castelnau, 1855

= Orangespotted filefish =

Species of fish

The orangespotted filefish (Cantherhines pullus) is a species of filefish described by Ranzani in 1842. and it is native to shallow waters in the tropical and subtropical Atlantic Ocean, the Caribbean Sea and the Gulf of Mexico.

== Distribution and habitat ==
The orangespotted filefish occurs in the Caribbean Sea, the northern half of the Gulf of Mexico and the tropical and subtropical waters of the Atlantic Ocean. In the western Atlantic, its range extends from Massachusetts to southeastern Brazil, while in the eastern Atlantic, it is known from São Tomé and the Gulf of Guinea. It is usually found on reefs at depths between about 3 and 50 m (10 and 160 ft), but usually no deeper than 20 m (70 ft).

== Description ==
The orangespotted filefish grows to a length of about 20 cm (8 in). The head has a number of wavy yellowish lines which run down onto the snout; near the eyes these alternate with bluish lines. The body has a number of broad brown bands separated by narrow whitish-yellow bands which converge at the caudal peduncle and continue onto the tailfin. On the caudal peduncle there is a moderate-sized white spot, often with a smaller white spot below it. The body is speckled with small orange spots, some of which have brown centres, and similar sized white spots. The first spine of the dorsal fin is located above the eye. It is very large and is separate from the rest of the fin. Immediately behind its base is a groove into which it can be folded when not needed.

== Ecology ==
The orangespotted filefish tends to swim near the seabed over rocky and coral reefs, hiding among the taller corals and gorgonians. It feeds mainly on sponges and algae, but also consumes tunicates, bryozoans and other bottom-dwelling invertebrates. Juveniles are found in the water column away from reefs and are preyed on by tuna, billfishes, and other large predatory fishes. This fish is held in low esteem by humans and seldom eaten by them.

== Gallery ==
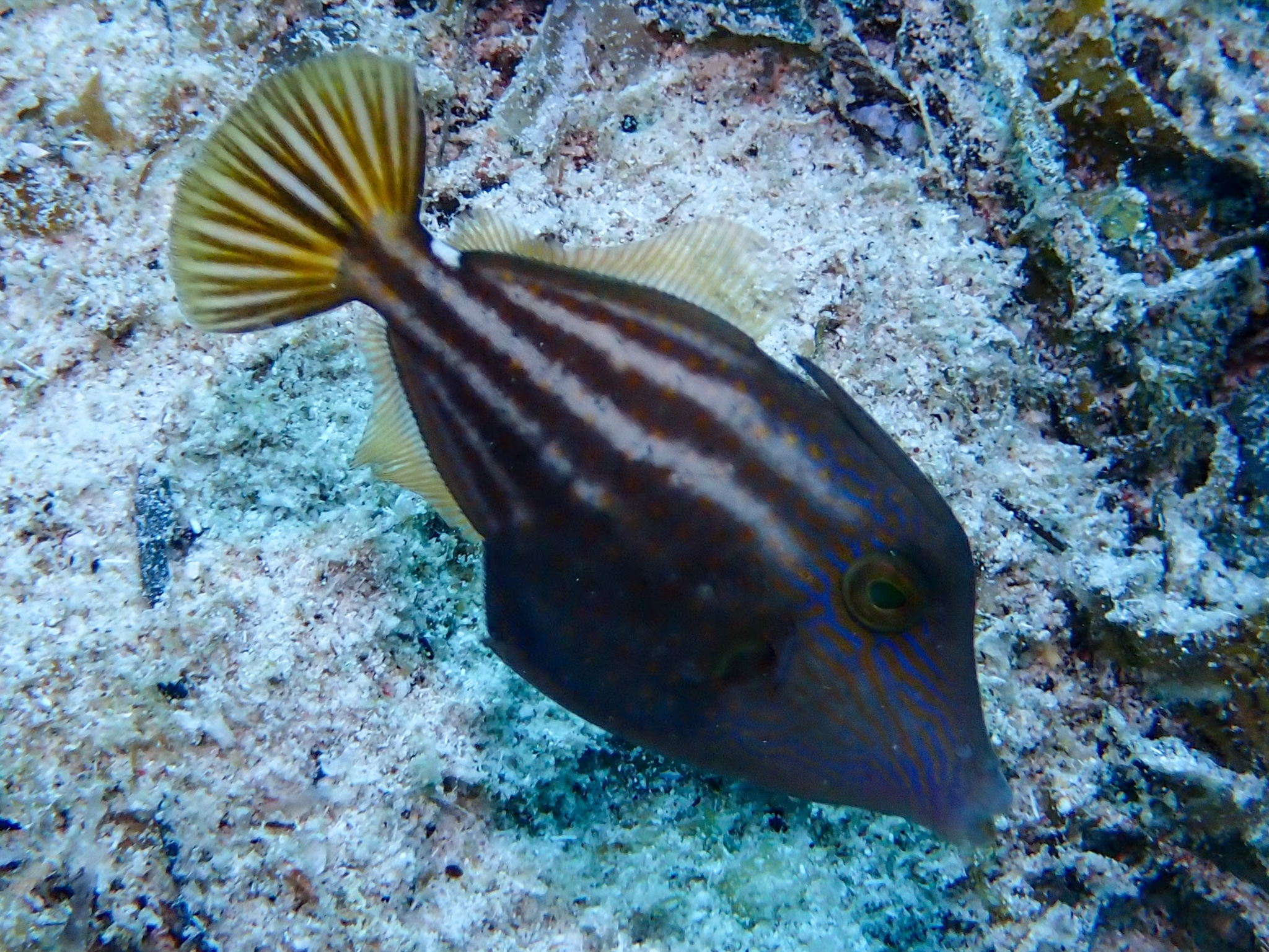

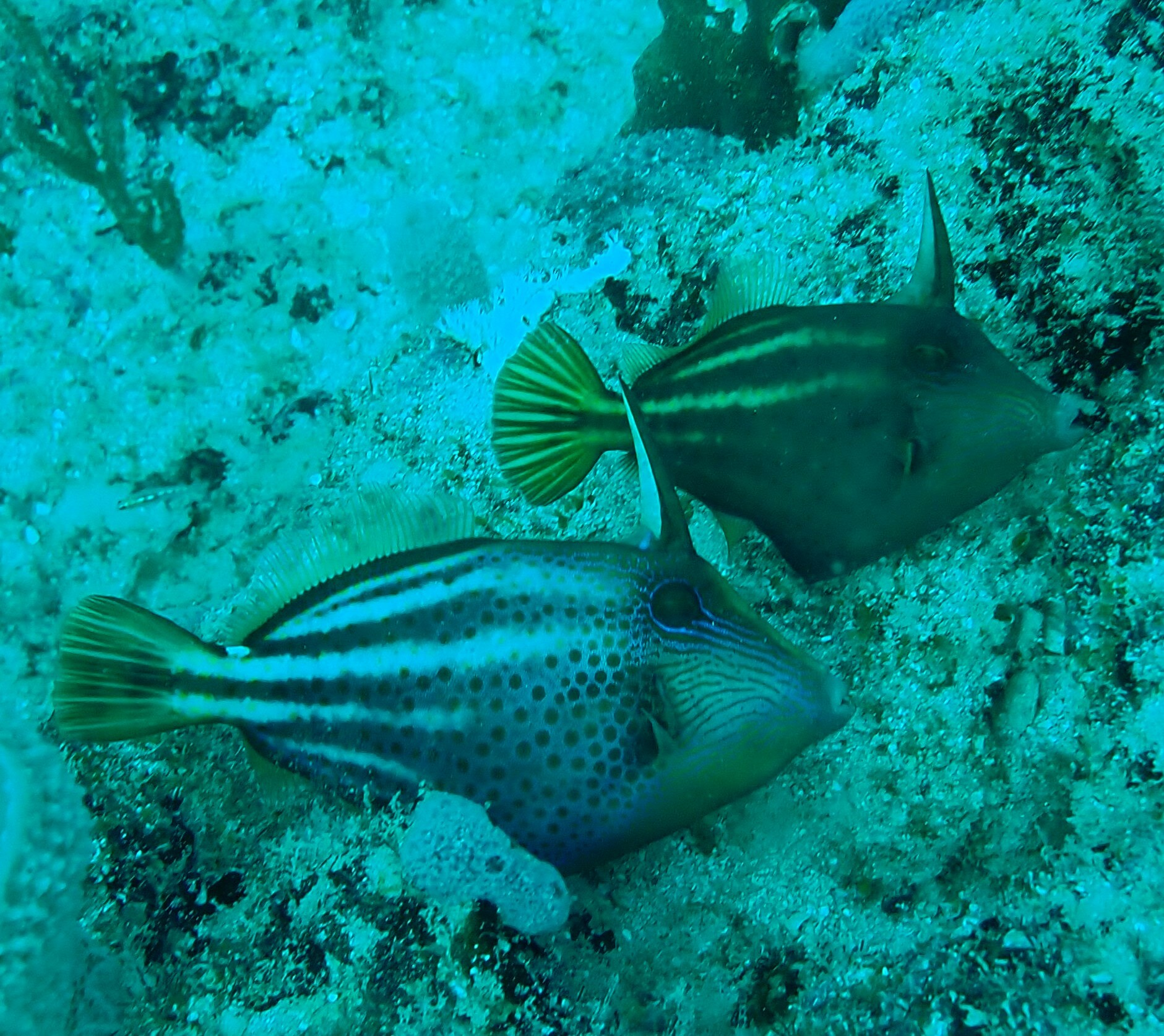

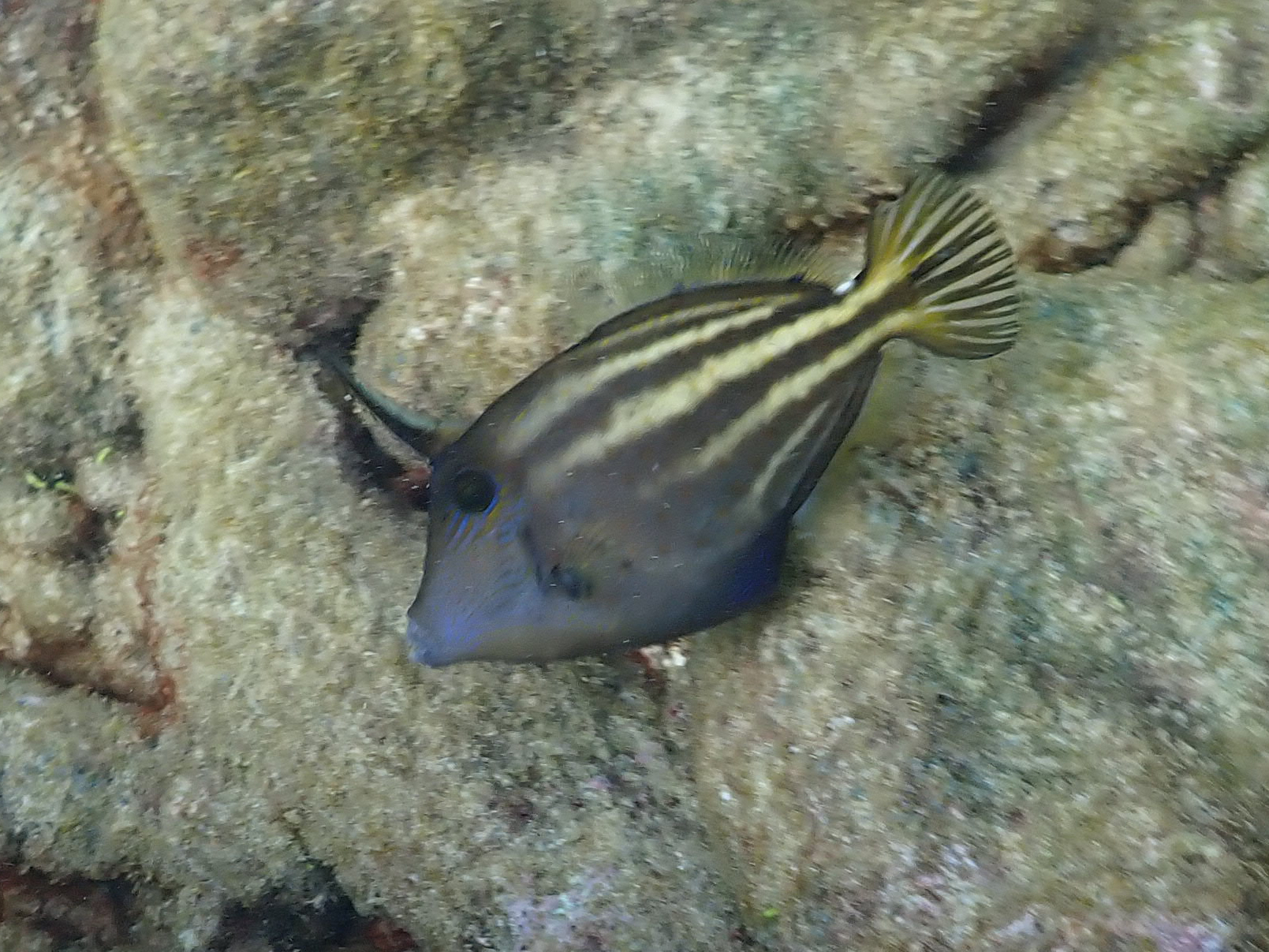

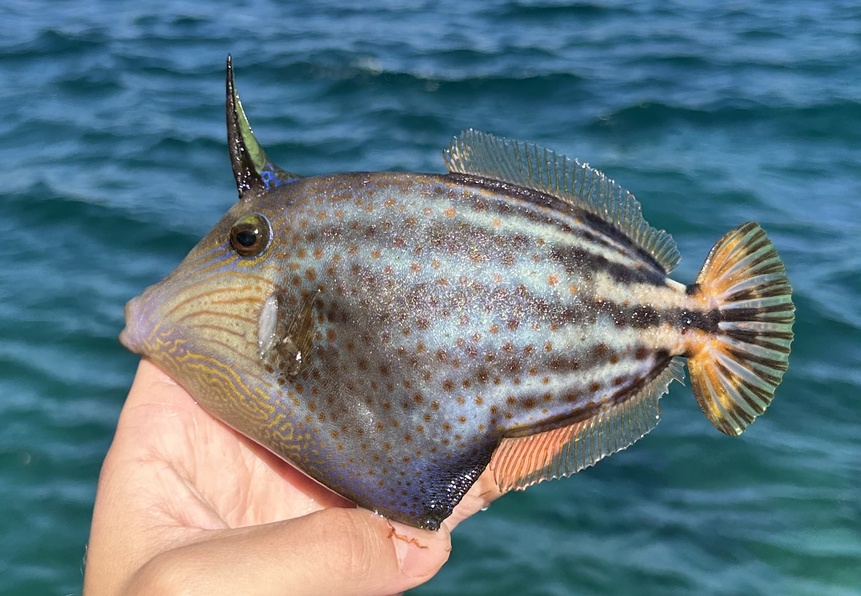
