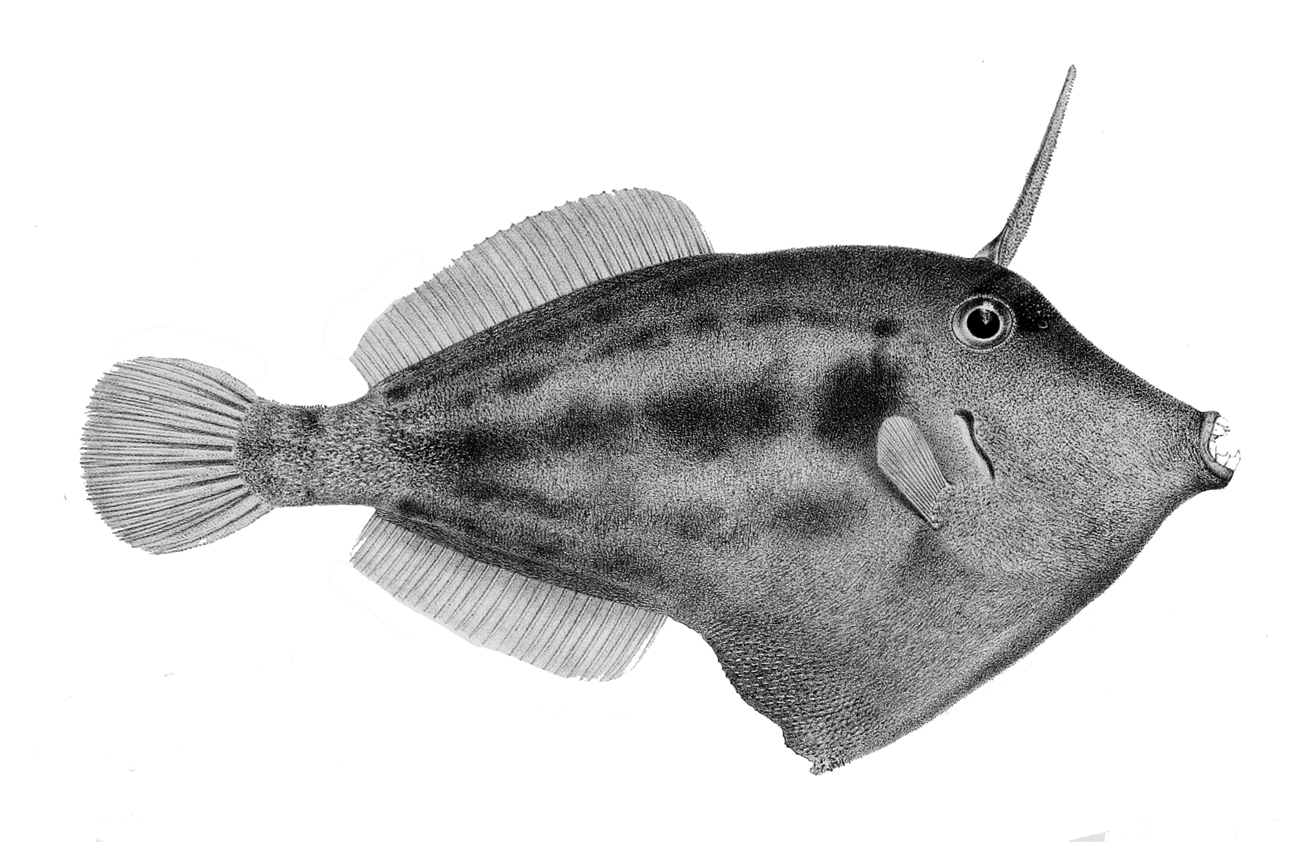

Conservation status
- Least Concern (IUCN 3.1)

Scientific classification
- Kingdom: Animalia
- Phylum: Chordata
- Class: Actinopterygii
- Order: Tetraodontiformes
- Family: Monacanthidae
- Genus: Cantherhines
- Species: C. fronticinctus

Binomial name
- Cantherhines fronticinctus (Günther, 1867)

= Cantherhines fronticinctus =

Species of fish

Cantherhines fronticinctus, known commonly as the spectacled filefish, is a species of marine fish in the family Monacanthidae.

The spectacled filefish is widespread throughout the tropical waters of the Indo/ West Pacific area.

The spectacled filefish is a small sized fish that can reach a maximum size of 25 cm (9.8 in) in length.
