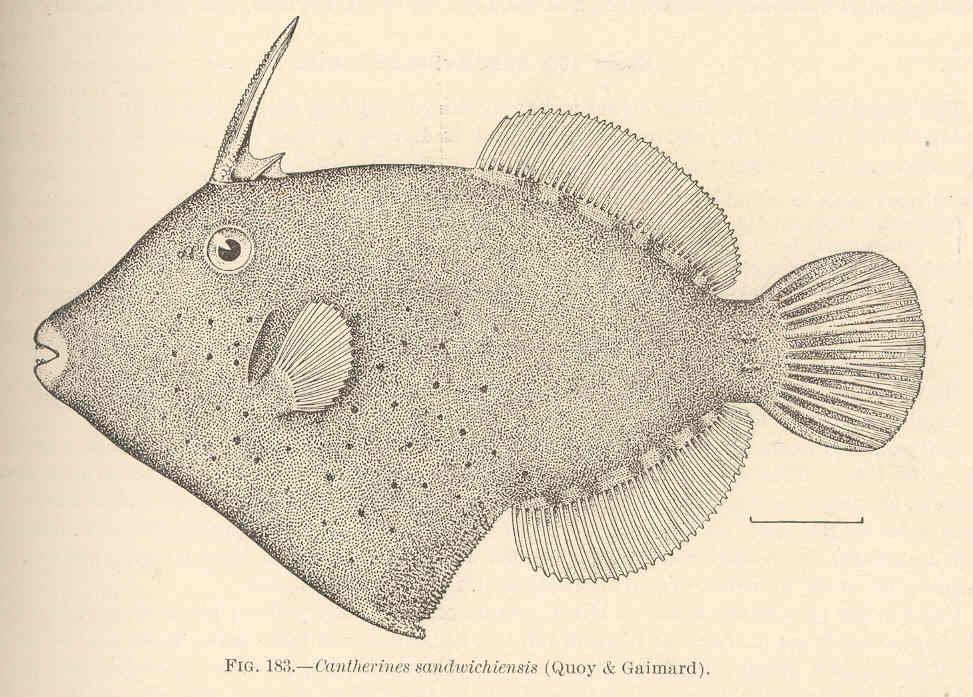

Scientific classification
- Kingdom: Animalia
- Phylum: Chordata
- Class: Actinopterygii
- Division: Teleostei
- Order: Tetraodontiformes
- Family: Monacanthidae
- Genus: Cantherhines
- Species: C. sandwichiensis

Binomial name
- Cantherhines sandwichiensis Quoy & Gaimard, 1824

Synonyms
- Amanses sandwichiensis (Quoy & Gaimard, 1824); Balistes sandwichiensis Quoy & Gaimard, 1824; Monacanthus sandwichiensis (Quoy & Gaimard, 1824); Monacanthus nasutus Swainson, 1839; Monocanthus nasutus Swainson, 1839

= Cantherhines sandwichiensis =

Species of fish

Cantherhines sandwichiensis, also called sandwich isle filefish, squaretail filefish, or - in Hawaiian - ʻōʻililepa. It is a marine fish in the family Monacanthidae.

== Description ==
It can reach up to about 19 cm (7.5 in) in length. Its body is brown with a glean of purple or blue, while its fins are yellow.

== Distribution and habitat ==
Cantherhines sandwichiensis lives in reef ecosystem habitats, at depths of 2 to 73 m (7 to 240 ft), with a range from Hawai'i, Oceania, western Indian and Atlantic Oceans.

== Behavior ==
It is a bottom feeder that also eats other things such as coral.
