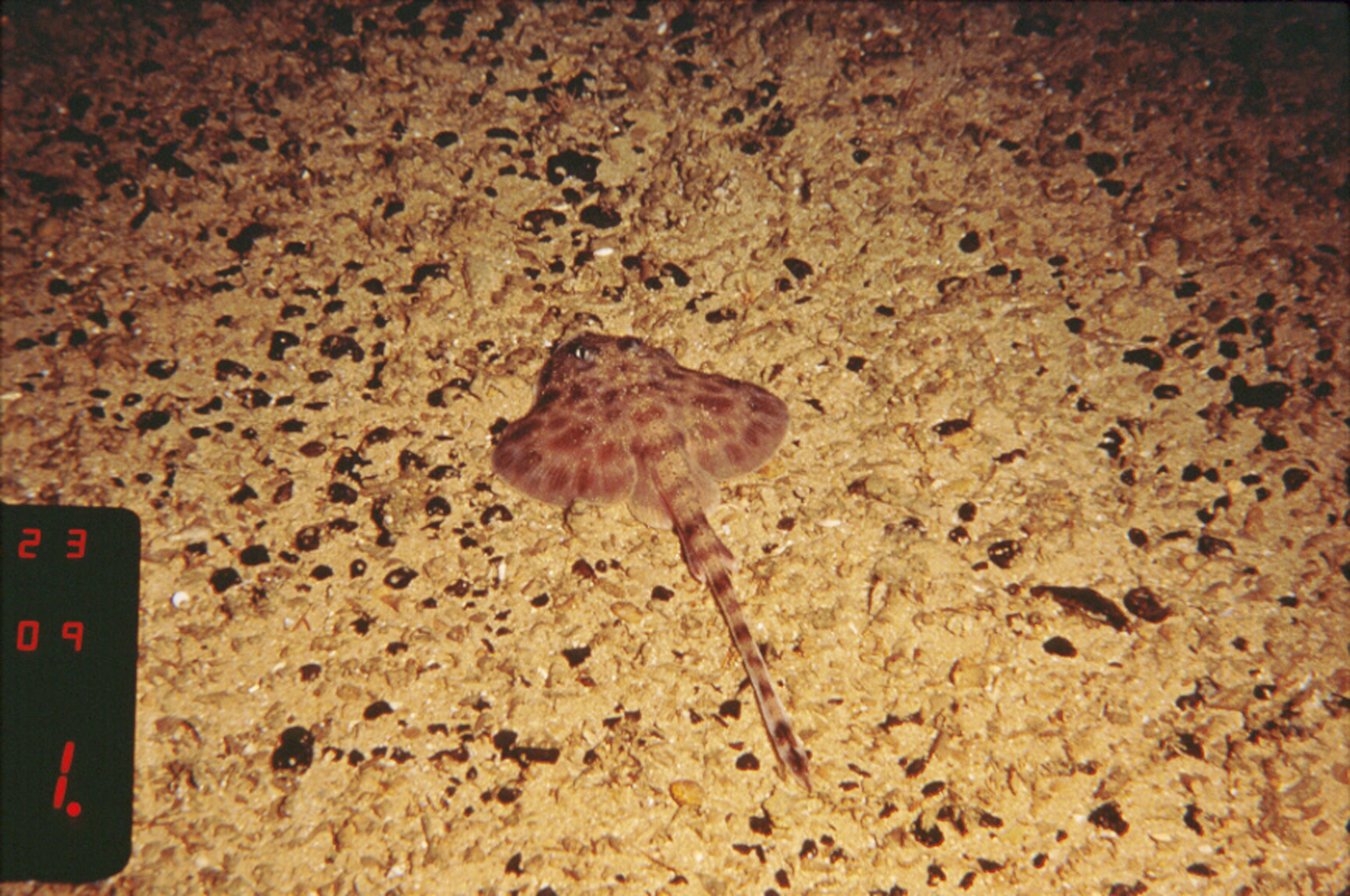
- A Pluto skate (Fenestraja plutonia) found on iron-stained sand bottom with manganese nodules

Scientific classification
- Kingdom: Animalia
- Phylum: Chordata
- Class: Chondrichthyes
- Subclass: Elasmobranchii
- Order: Rajiformes
- Family: Gurgesiellidae de Buen, 1959

Genera
- See text

= Gurgesiellidae =

Pygmy skates

Family of fishes

Pygmy skates are cartilaginous fish belonging to the family Gurgesiellidae in the superorder Batoidea of rays. Nineteen species in three genera are known.

== Genera ==
- Cruriraja Bigelow & Schroeder, 1948
- Fenestraja McEachran & Compagno, 1982
- Gurgesiella de Buen, 1959
