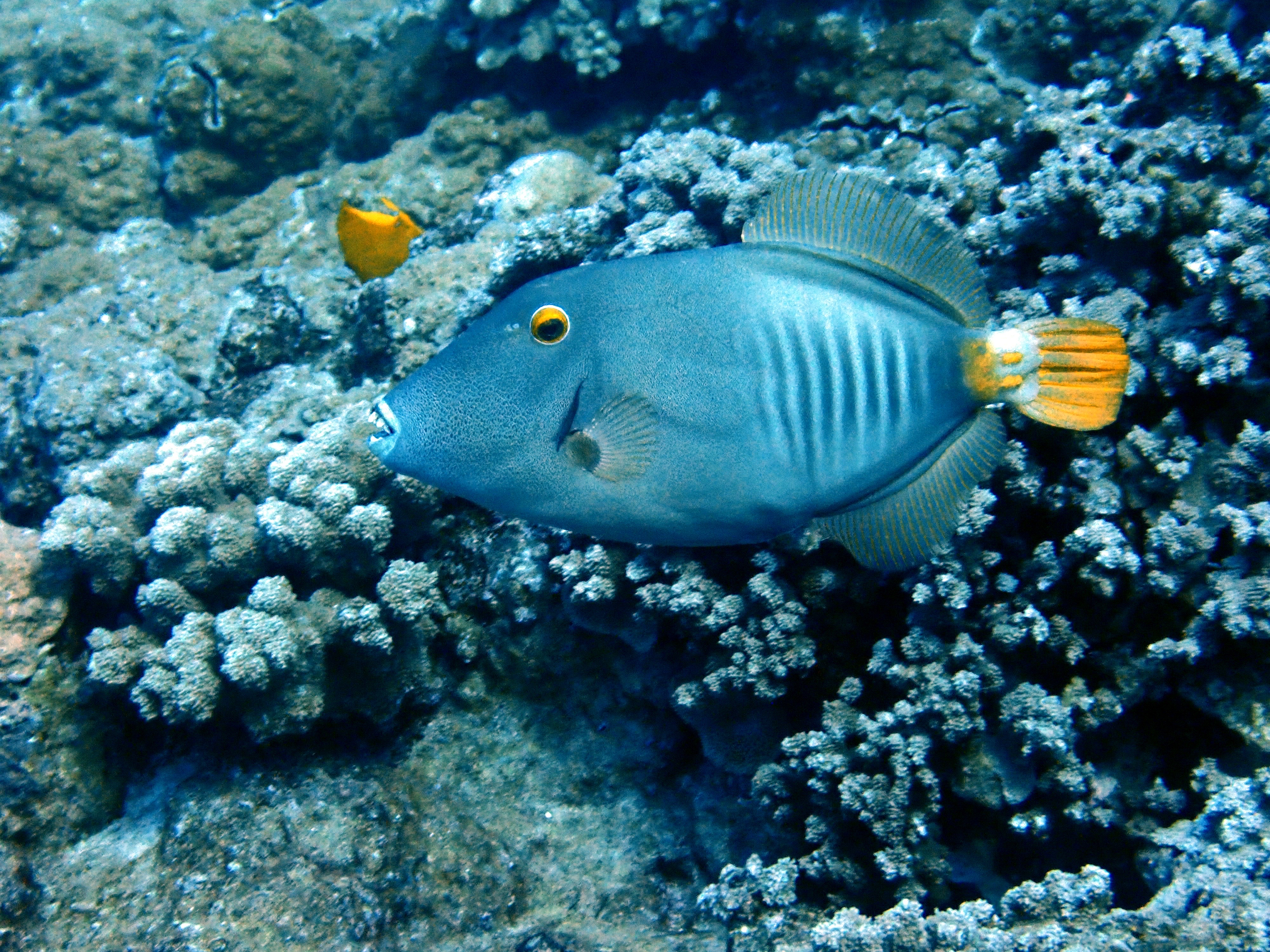

Conservation status
- Least Concern (IUCN 3.1)

Scientific classification
- Kingdom: Animalia
- Phylum: Chordata
- Class: Actinopterygii
- Division: Teleostei
- Order: Tetraodontiformes
- Family: Monacanthidae
- Genus: Cantherhines
- Species: C. dumerilii

Binomial name
- Cantherhines dumerilii (Henri Hollard, 1854)

Synonyms
- List: Cantherhines albopunctatus (Seale, 1901); Cantherhines carolae Jordan & McGregor, 1898; Cantherhines howensis (Ogilby, 1889); Monacanthus albopunctatus Seale, 1901; Monacanthus dumerilii Hollard, 1854; Monacanthus howensis Ogilby, 1889

= Cantherhines dumerilii =

Species of fish

Cantherhines dumerilii is a species of fish in the family Monacanthidae, the filefishes. Its common names include whitespotted filefish, barred filefish, orange-fin file, yelloweye leatherjacket, and vagabond filefish. It is distributed in the Indian and Pacific Oceans where it is found on coral reefs.

== Etymology ==
The fish is named in honor of August Duméril (1812–1870), a herpetologist and ichthyologist, at the Muséum national d'Histoire naturelle (Paris), who made the type specimen available to Hollard.

== Distribution and habitat ==
Cantherhines dumerilii is native to the Indo-Pacific region. Its range extends from the East African coast to French Polynesia, Japan and Hawaii. It is also present in the eastern Pacific Ocean off the coasts of Mexico and Colombia. It is a common resident of coral reefs and likes to have rock crevices and caves to retreat into if disturbed. Juveniles are pelagic and sometimes hide under floating objects.

== Description ==
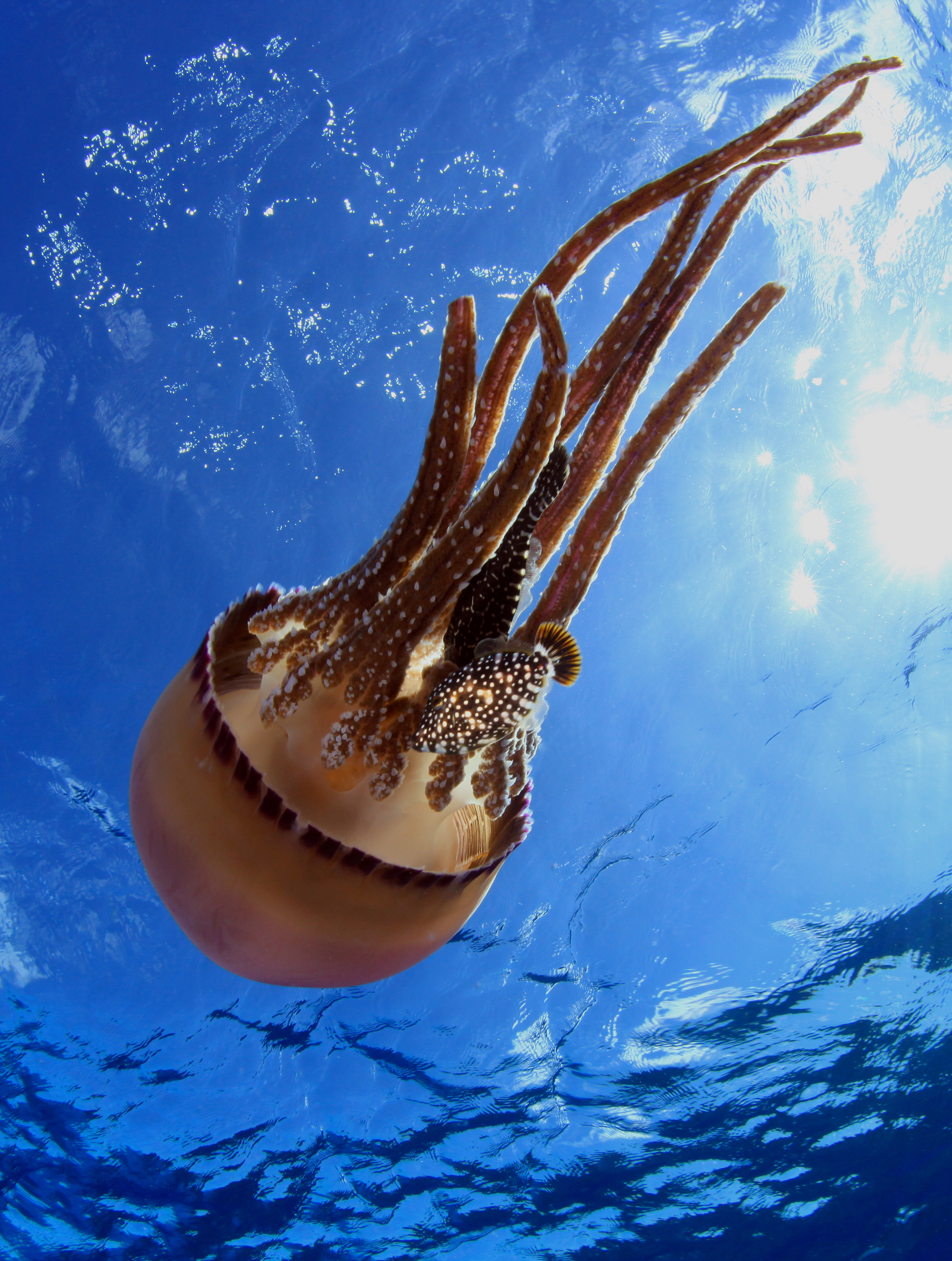
Juvenile following a Thysanostoma jellyfish

This fish can reach 38 cm (15 in) in length but is more usually around 25 cm (10 in). The dorsal fin has two spines and thirty-four to thirty-nine soft rays. The anal fin has no spines and twenty-eight to thirty-five soft rays. This fish has yellow eyes and its general color is grayish or yellowish-brown with about twelve vertical dark bars. The fleshy lips are white. The tail fin is small, rounded and orange and the other fins are yellowish. The spines on the caudal peduncle are orange, with the male having longer and deeper orange caudal spines and a darker orange caudal fin and darker eyes.

== Behavior ==
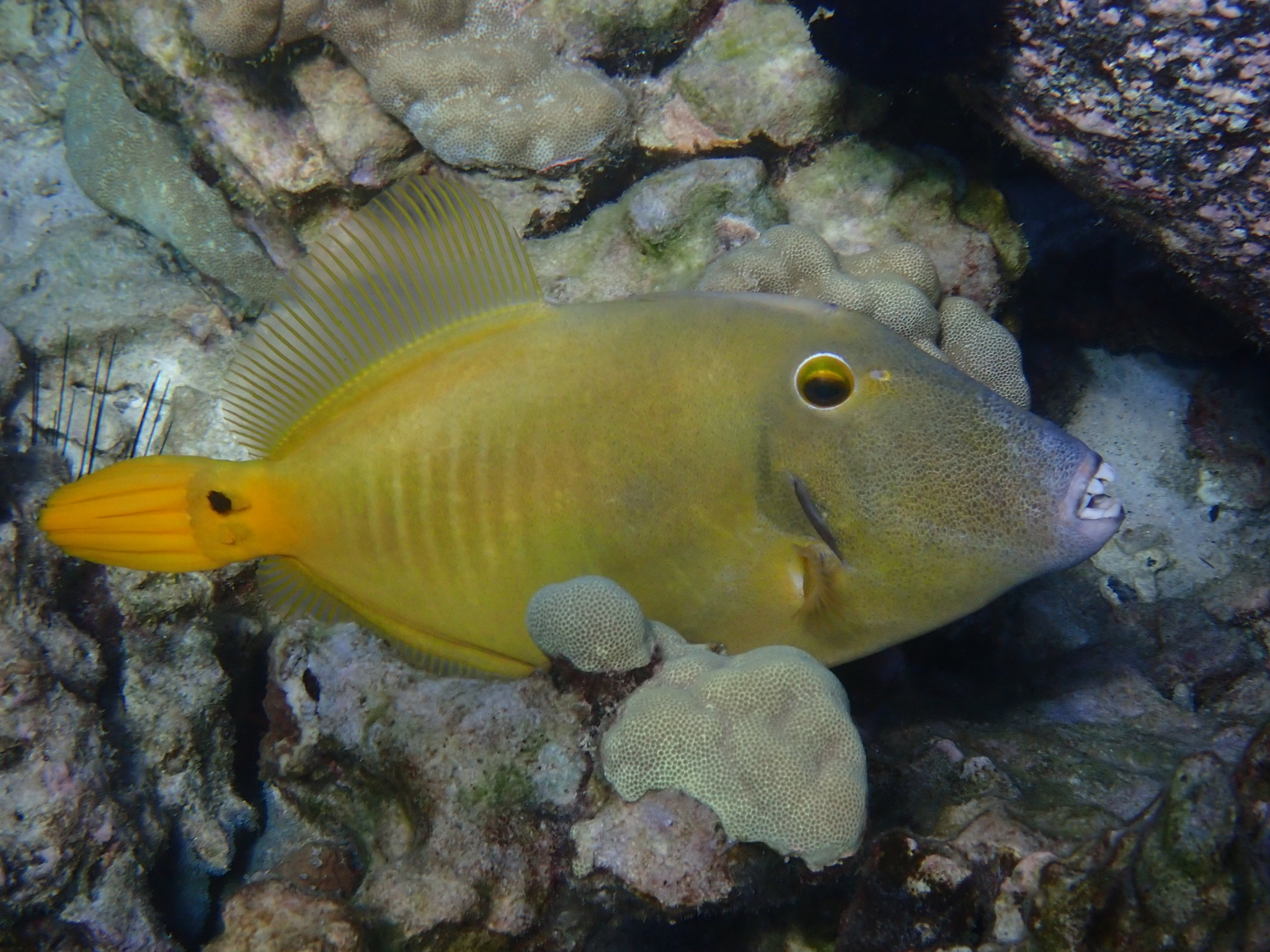
In Hawaii

The fish lives around reefs down to depths of 70 m (230 ft), but usually staying in shallower waters and sometimes nearing the surface. It is a shy fish, hiding if danger threatens. It is usually seen singly or in pairs and feeds on the tips of branching corals, algae, sponges, sea urchins, and molluscs.
