= Fernando de Buen y Lozano =

Spanish ichthyologist and oceanographer

Fernando de Buen y Lozano (10 October 1895 – 6 May 1962) was a Spanish ichthyologist and oceanographer. He lived in Mexico, Uruguay, and Chile. In Uruguay, he was the director of the Department of Science at the Oceanography and Fisheries Service as well as Professor of Hydrobiology and Protozoology in the Faculty of Arts and Sciences. He was an honorary foreign member of the American Society of Ichthyologists and Herpetologists.

== See also ==
- Category:Taxa named by Fernando de Buen y Lozano
