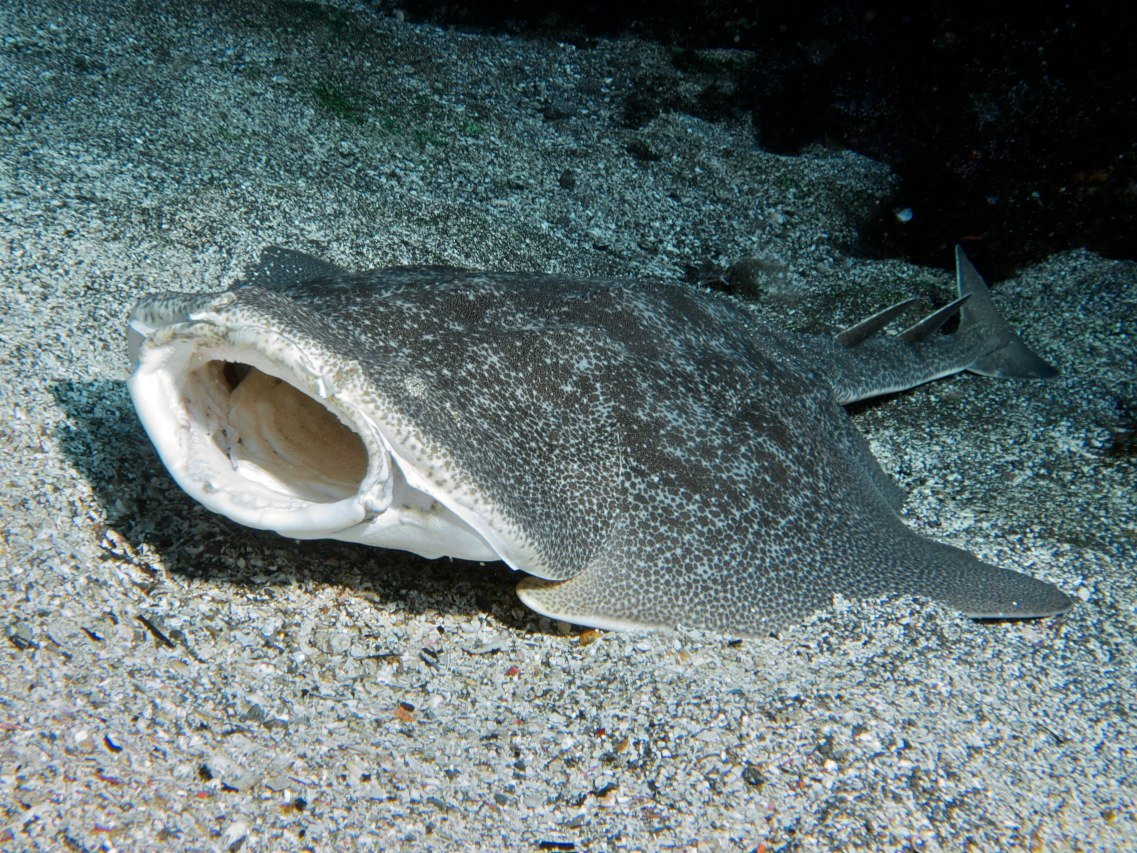

Conservation status
- Critically Endangered (IUCN 3.1)

Scientific classification
- Kingdom: Animalia
- Phylum: Chordata
- Class: Chondrichthyes
- Subclass: Elasmobranchii
- Division: Selachii
- Order: Squatiniformes
- Family: Squatinidae
- Genus: Squatina
- Species: S. japonica

Binomial name
- Squatina japonica Bleeker, 1858
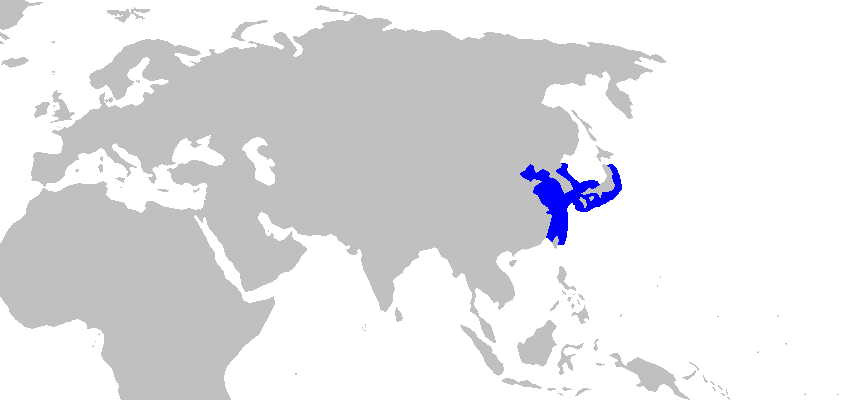
- Range of the Japanese angelshark

= Japanese angelshark =

Species of shark

The Japanese angelshark (Squatina japonica) is a species of angelshark, family Squatinidae, found in the northwestern Pacific Ocean off China, Japan, and Korea. It is a bottom-dwelling shark found in sandy habitats down to 300 m (980 ft) deep. This species has the flattened shape with wing-like pectoral and pelvic fins typical of its family, and grows to 1.5 m (4.9 ft) or more in length. Its two dorsal fins are placed behind the pelvic fins, and a row of large thorns occurs along its dorsal midline. Its upper surface is cryptically patterned, with numerous squarish dark spots on a brown background.

Feeding on fishes, cephalopods, and crustaceans, the Japanese angelshark is a nocturnal ambush predator that spends most of the day lying still on the sea floor. This species gives birth to live young, which are sustained during gestation by yolk. The litter size varies from two to 10. The Japanese angelshark is not dangerous to humans unless provoked. It is fished in large numbers and used for meat and shagreen, a type of leather.

== Taxonomy and phylogeny ==
The Japanese angelshark was described by Dutch ichthyologist Pieter Bleeker in an 1858 volume of the scientific journal Acta Societatis Scientiarum Indo-Neerlandicae. The type specimen is a male 53 cm (21 in) long, collected off Nagasaki, Japan, hence the specific epithet japonica. Other common names for this species include change angel shark, change canopy shark, Japanese angelfish, and Japanese monkfish.

Using mitochondrial DNA, a 2010 phylogenetic analysis reported that the Japanese angelshark forms a clade with the other Asian angelsharks included in the study: the ocellated angelshark (S. tergocellatoides) and the sister species pair of the Taiwan angelshark (S. formosa) and the Indonesian angelshark (S. legnota). These Asian species are, in turn, allied with European and North African angel shark species. Molecular clock estimation suggested the Japanese angelshark lineage diverged from the rest of the Asian angelsharks some 100 million years ago during the Cretaceous.

== Description ==
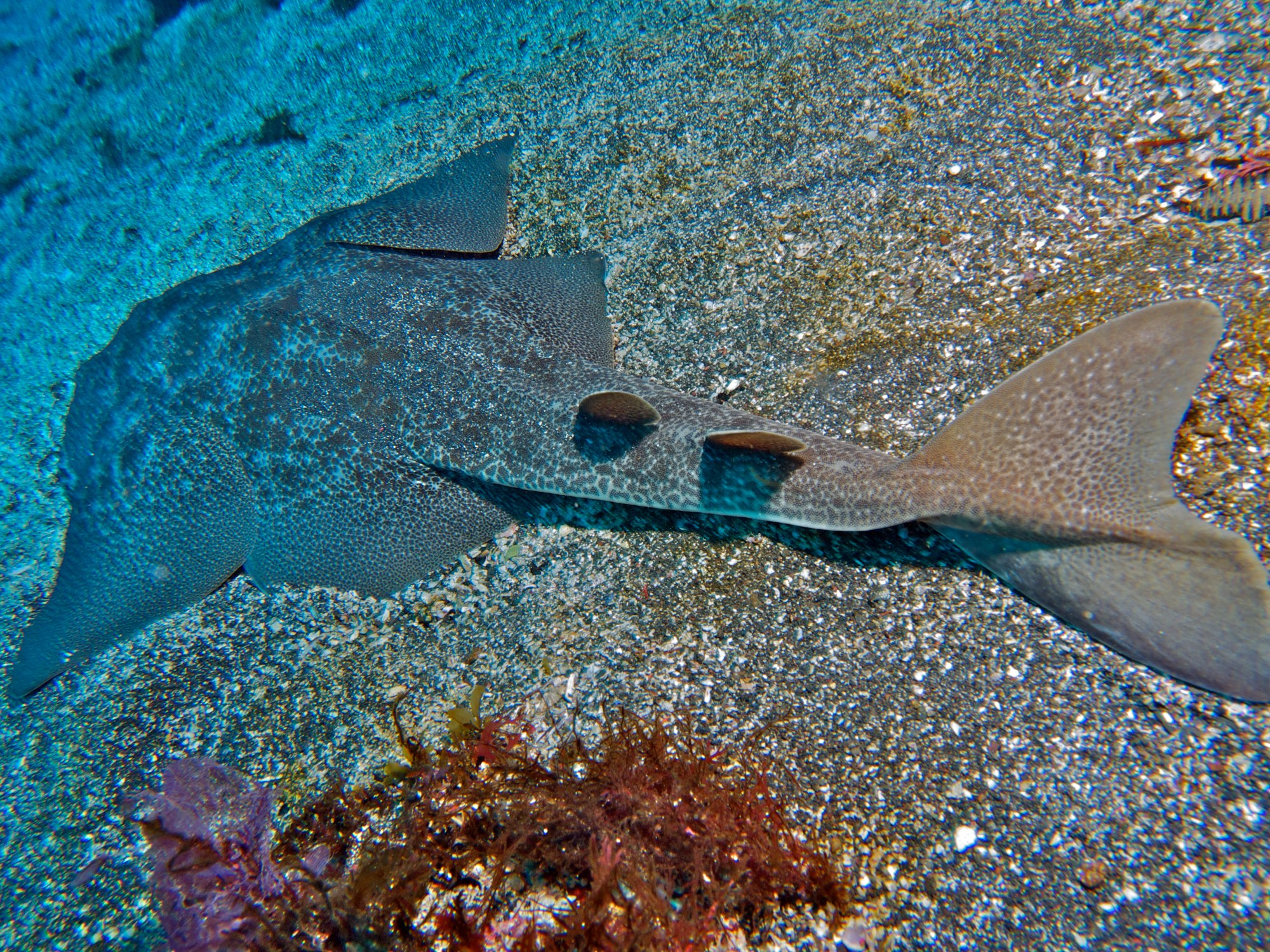
The dorsal fins of the Japanese angelshark are located behind the rear tips of the pelvic fins.

The Japanese angelshark is fairly narrow-bodied and has greatly enlarged pectoral and pelvic fins. The skin folds along the sides of the head lack distinct lobes. The eyes are oval and widely spaced; closely behind are crescent-shaped spiracles with large, boxy projections inside their anterior rims. Each nostril is large and preceded by a small flap of skin bearing two barbels; the outer barbel is thin, while the inner barbel has a spoon-like tip and a smooth to slightly fringed flange at the base. The wide mouth is terminally placed and has furrows at the corners. There are 10 tooth rows on either side of both jaws, separated by a gap in the middle; the teeth are small, narrow, and pointed. There are five pairs of gill slits located on the sides of the head.

The frontmost portion of each pectoral fin forms a triangular lobe separate from the head. The outer corners of the pectoral fins are angular, and their rear tips are rounded. The pelvic fins have convex margins. The two angular dorsal fins are similar in shape and size, and are located behind the pelvic fins. The caudal peduncle is flattened with a keel running along either side, and supports a roughly triangular caudal fin with rounded corners. The lower lobe of the caudal fin is larger than the upper. The dorsal surface is covered by medium-sized dermal denticles, and a distinctive row of large thorns is present along the midline of the back and tail. This species is light to dark brown above with a dense covering of squarish dark spots, which become finer on the fins. The underside is white with darker mottling. Various sources give differing maximum lengths, ranging from 1.5 to 2.5 m (4.9 to 8.2 ft).

== Distribution and habitat ==
The Japanese angelshark is native to the cooler waters of the northwestern Pacific; its range extends from the eastern coast of Honshu, Japan, to Taiwan, and includes the southern Sea of Japan, the Yellow Sea, the East China Sea, and the Taiwan Strait. Some older sources reported it may occur in the Philippines, but recent research suggests the only angel shark species in that area is S. caillieti. The Japanese angelshark inhabits the continental shelf, usually in the shallows, but also to as deep as 300 m (980 ft). It is a bottom-dweller found over sandy bottoms, often close to rocky reefs.

== Biology and ecology ==
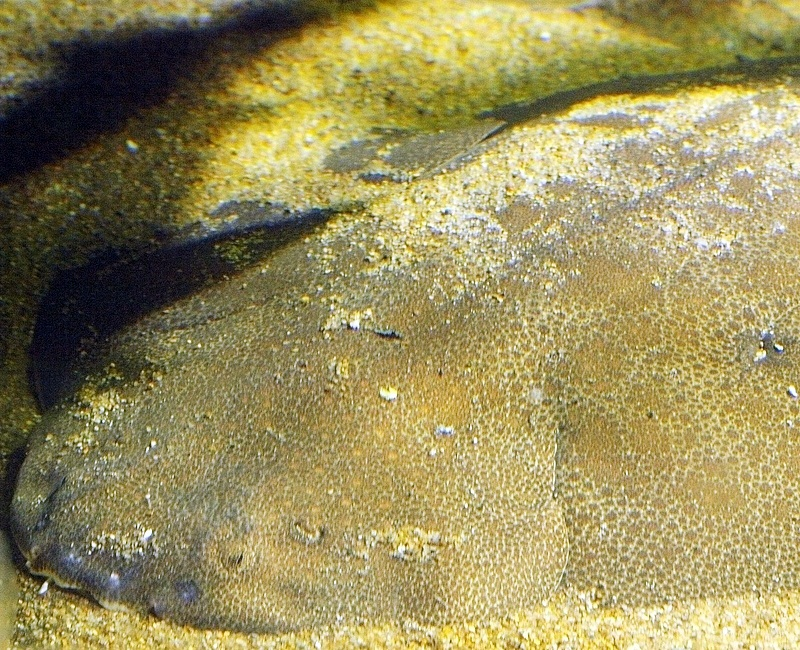
The Japanese angelshark generally lies motionless and buried in daytime.

During the day, the Japanese angelshark mostly lies partly buried on the bottom; its complex color pattern provides camouflage as it ambushes nearby prey. At night, this species becomes more active. Its diet consists of demersal fishes, cephalopods, and crustaceans. It may be found alone or in proximity to others of its species. Parasites documented from this species include the tapeworms Phyliobothrium marginatum and Tylocephalum squatinae, the copepods Eudactylina squatini and Trebius shiinoi, and the praniza larvae of the isopod Gnathia trimaculata. The Japanese angelshark is viviparous, and as in other members of its family the developing embryos are nourished by yolk. Litters of two to ten pups are birthed in spring and summer, with the newborns measuring 22 cm (8.7 in) long. Females mature sexually at 80 cm (31 in) long, while male maturation size is unknown.

== Human interactions ==
The Japanese angelshark is typically inoffensive towards humans, but if disturbed, can inflict a severe bite. Across much of its range, it is a frequent catch (intentional or not) in bottom trawls and probably also set nets and demersal gillnets; the meat is eaten and the rough skin is made into a type of leather called shagreen for use in wood finishing.

Angel sharks in general are highly threatened by commercial trawl fisheries due to their susceptibility to capture and low rate of reproduction, and angel shark species elsewhere are known to have declined markedly under fishing pressure. Trawling activity in the Yellow Sea and other parts of the northwestern Pacific is intense and, coupled with pollution, has had a serious impact on the local ecosystem. The Japanese angelshark population is suspected to have declined by up to 50% or more under these conditions, leading the species to be assessed as critically endangered by the International Union for Conservation of Nature (IUCN). It may benefit from a ban on trawling imposed in some areas by the Chinese government, though enforcement is inconsistent.
