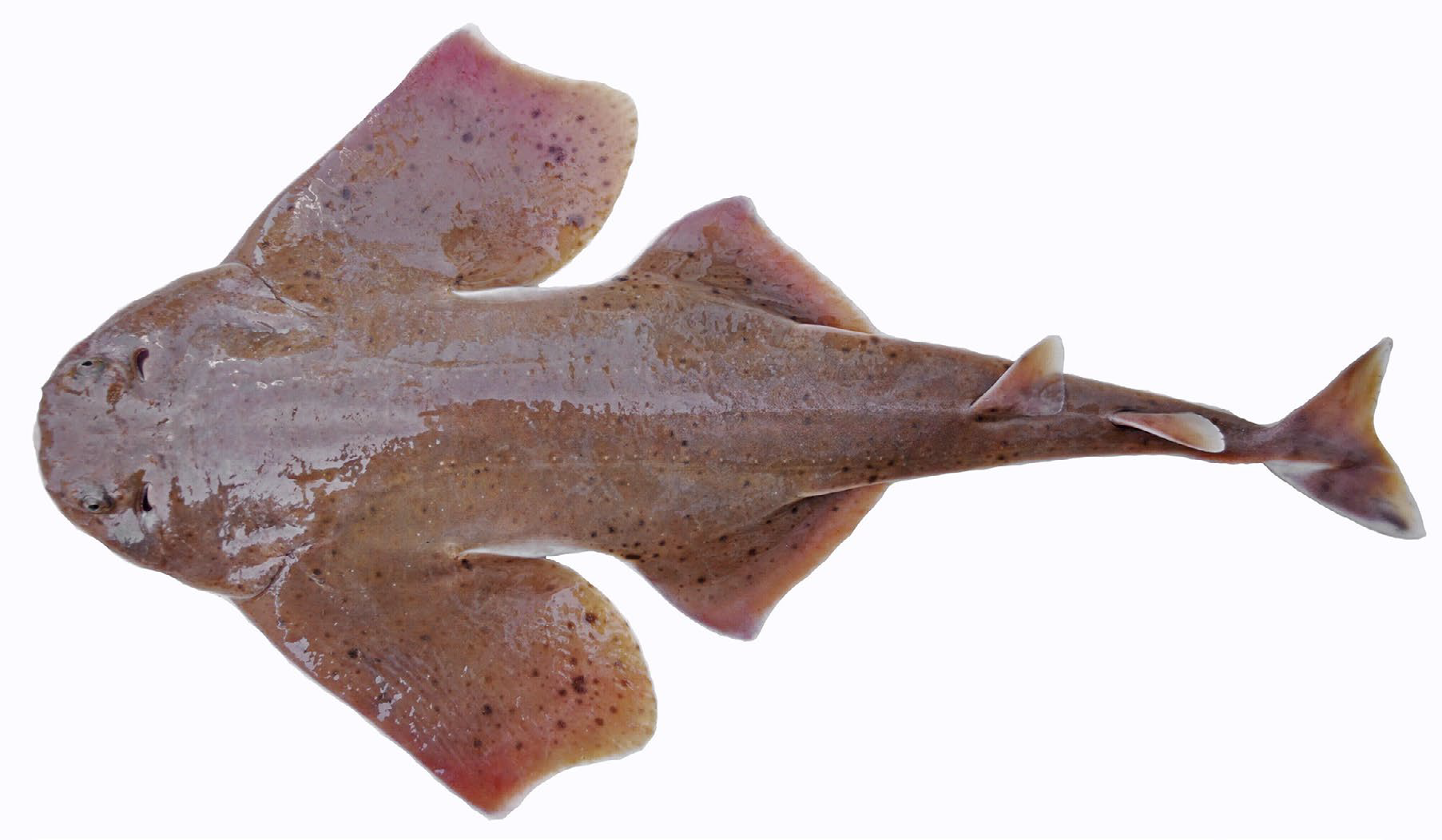

Conservation status
- Near Threatened (IUCN 3.1)

Scientific classification
- Kingdom: Animalia
- Phylum: Chordata
- Class: Chondrichthyes
- Subclass: Elasmobranchii
- Division: Selachii
- Order: Squatiniformes
- Family: Squatinidae
- Genus: Squatina
- Species: S. david

Binomial name
- Squatina david Acero P., Tavera Vargas, Anguila-Gómez, & Hernández-Beracasa, 2016

= David's angelshark =

Species of shark

David's angelshark (Squatina david) is a species of angelshark newly described in 2016. It can grow up to around 75 cm in length and is coloured greyish to brownish yellow. Male specimen are dark spotted, while females have abundant whitish spots. David's angelshark inhabits the northern coast of South America from Colombia to Suriname and is currently known from a depth between 100 and 150 m.

It is a sister species of the angular angel shark (Squatina guggenheim) and the hidden angelshark (Squatina occulta).
