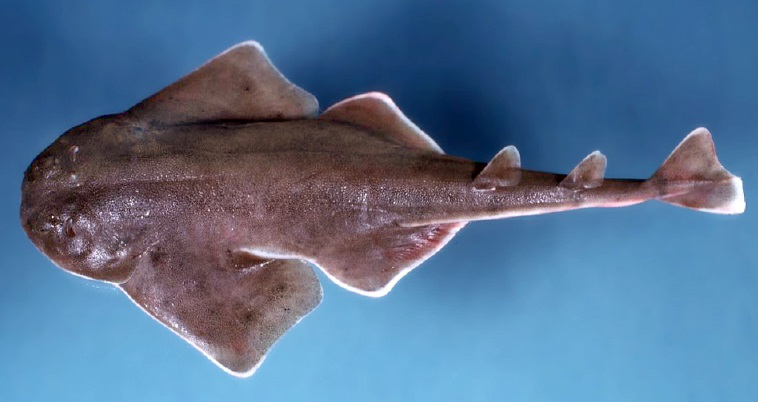

Conservation status
- Least Concern (IUCN 3.1)

Scientific classification
- Kingdom: Animalia
- Phylum: Chordata
- Class: Chondrichthyes
- Subclass: Elasmobranchii
- Division: Selachii
- Order: Squatiniformes
- Family: Squatinidae
- Genus: Squatina
- Species: S. dumeril

Binomial name
- Squatina dumeril Lesueur, 1818
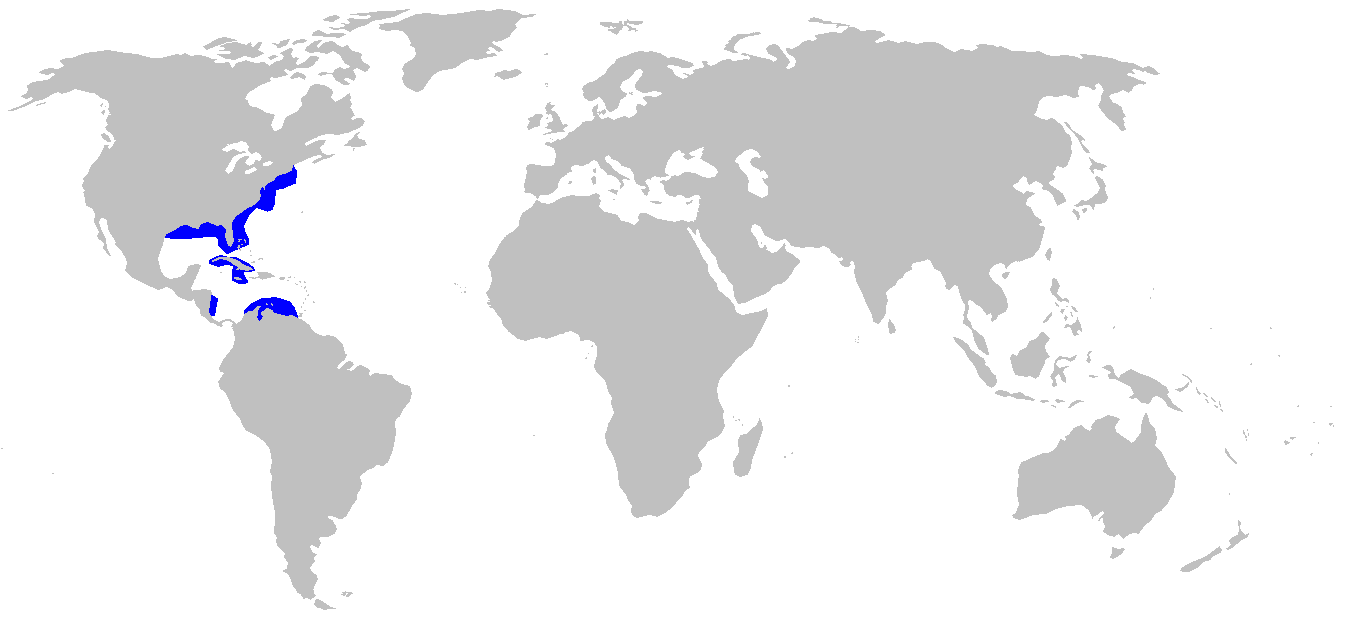
- Range of the sand devil

= Sand devil =

Species of shark

The sand devil or Atlantic angel shark (Squatina dumeril) is a species of angelshark, family Squatinidae, native to the northwestern Atlantic Ocean. It occurs off the eastern United States, in the northern Gulf of Mexico, and possibly in parts of the Caribbean Sea. This bottom-dwelling shark is found in shallow inshore waters in summer and fall, and deep offshore waters in winter and spring. The sand devil's flattened body and enlarged pectoral and pelvic fins give it a ray-like appearance. There is a band of enlarged thorns running along the middle of its back. It is gray or brown in color, with scattered small dark spots. This species reaches 1.2–1.5 m (3.9–4.9 ft) in length.

The diet of the sand devil consists mainly of small teleost fishes and squid, which are captured via ambush attack. This species is viviparous, with the unborn young nourished by their yolk sacs. Females have a multi-year reproductive cycle and give birth to 4–25 pups in spring or early summer, following a 12-month gestation period. The sand devil is not aggressive, but may attempt to bite if harassed or captured. Though not valued economically, it is caught incidentally by commercial bottom trawl fisheries.

== Taxonomy and phylogeny ==
French naturalist Charles Alexandre Lesueur described the sand devil in an 1818 volume of Journal of the Academy of Natural Sciences of Philadelphia. Previously, it had been regarded as the same species as the European Squatina squatina. Lesueur based his account on an adult male 1.2 m (3.9 ft) long caught off the eastern United States, and named the species in honor of André Marie Constant Duméril.

Phylogenetic analysis, based on mitochondrial DNA, has concluded that the sand devil and the Pacific angel shark (S. californica) are sister species. The two of them in turn form a clade with other angel sharks found in the Americas. Molecular clock estimation has timed the divergence of S. dumeril and S. californica at c. 6.1 Ma, around the time that the Isthmus of Panama formed. The rise of the Isthmus likely split the ancestral angel shark population, leading to their becoming separate species.

== Description ==
The sand devil has a flattened, moderately narrow body with greatly enlarged pectoral and pelvic fins. The skin folds along the sides of the head have smooth margins, without lobes. The large eyes are placed on top of the head and have prominent spiracles behind. The nostrils bear thin, pointed barbels with smooth or slightly fringed margins. The wide mouth is positioned terminally on the head. The jaws contain 10 upper and 9 lower tooth rows on each side, with toothless gaps at the middle. Each tooth has a broad base and a single pointed cusp with smooth edges. There are five pairs of gill slits located on the sides of the head.

The pectoral fins are broad and angular with narrow rear tips; the front of the pectoral fin is separate from the head, forming a triangular lobe. The two dorsal fins are similar in size and shape, and are positioned far back on the body. The anal fin is absent. The lower lobe of the caudal fin is larger than the upper. The dermal denticles have rounded bases and three horizontal ridges. There is a distinctive band of larger thorns running along the midline of the back, from the nape to the caudal peduncle. The dorsal coloration varies from greenish or bluish gray to reddish brown, with a scattering of small, darker spots and sometimes irregular splotches; the underside is uniformly pale. This species reaches 1.3–1.5 m (4.3–4.9 ft) in length and at least 16 kg (35 lb) in weight.

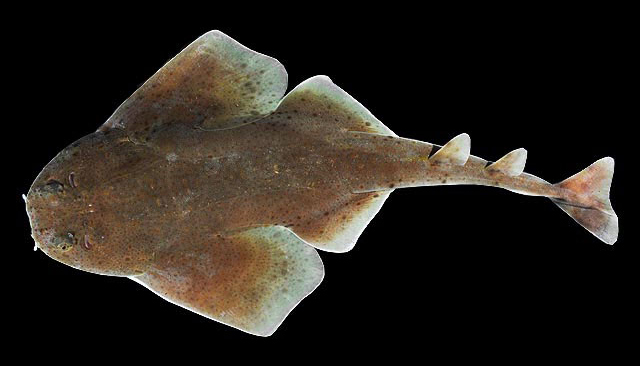
The sand devil is a ray-like shark with a color pattern of many small dark spots on a gray-brown background.

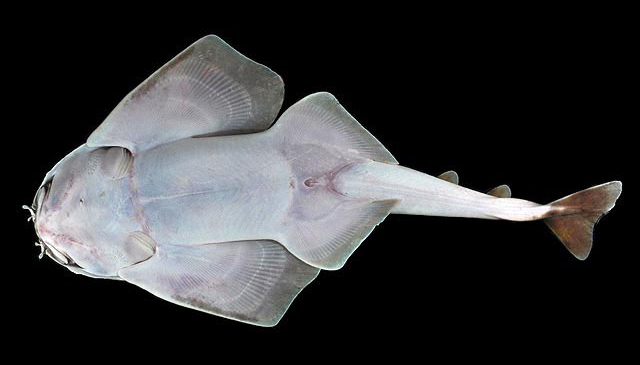
Underside

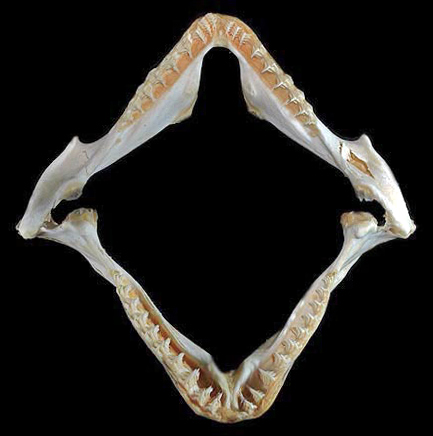
Jaws

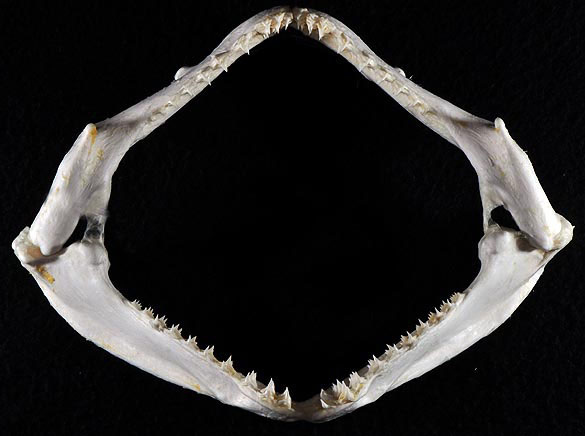
Jaws

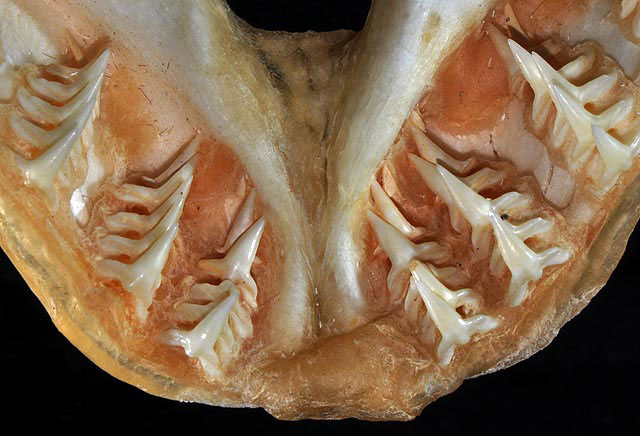
Central teeth

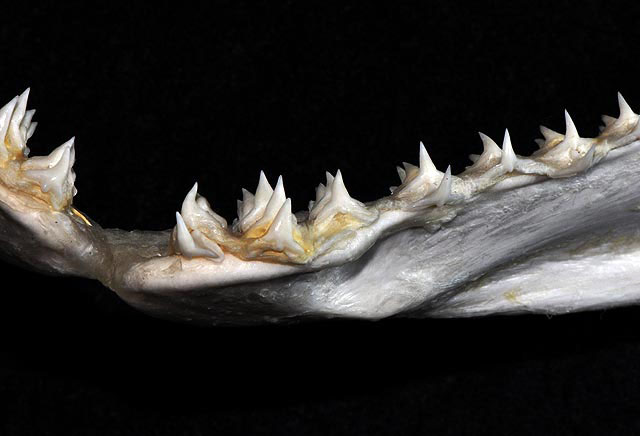
Lower teeth

== Distribution and habitat ==
The sand devil is found in the northwestern Atlantic Ocean from Massachusetts to the Florida Keys, where it is fairly common. It also occurs in the northern Gulf of Mexico, and there are additional unconfirmed records from Cuba, Jamaica, Nicaragua, and Venezuela. The southern extent of its range is uncertain due to confusion with the disparate angelshark (S. heteroptera) and Mexican angelshark (S. mexicana). Because they inhabit deep-waters and because of their low commercial value the effort put into data collection is low, as with many species under these circumstances. Although their appearances are fragmented they still are classified under large broader spaces due to the lack of research done. As a result, ranges of deep-water shark species are often considered continuous across broad expanses despite records of occurrence, in many cases, being spatially fragmented. This bottom-dwelling shark is found over sandy or muddy bottoms on the continental shelf and slope.

Off the eastern United States, the sand devil has been documented to migrate seasonally. In the summer, it moves towards the shore to depths of less than 35 m (115 ft), and many can be found in water only meters deep. During fall it can be found inshore, down to a depth of 90 m (300 ft). In winter and spring, it is found around the outer continental shelf at depths greater than 90 m (300 ft); individuals have been recorded as far as 140 km (87 mi) from land and 1,290 m (4,230 ft) deep.

== Biology and ecology ==
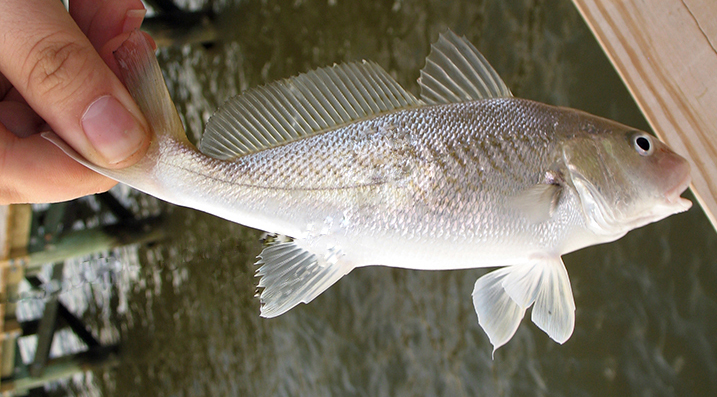
The Atlantic croaker is an important food source for the sand devil.

The sand devil is an ambush predator that spends much time buried in the bottom sediment. Its diet consists mainly of demersal teleost fishes such as croakers, goatfishes, and butterfishes. However, some types of demersal fishes such as jacks are rarely eaten, perhaps because they are more active and thus likely to escape attacks. Squid are a major secondary food source, particularly for smaller sharks. Crabs, shrimp, mantis shrimp, skates, and bivalves are infrequently eaten. This species feeds both during the day and at night. It tends to select prey approximately 50–60% as long as its mouth is wide; this size is consistent with what is predicted from optimal foraging theory to yield the most efficient rate of energy return. The variety of prey taken is greatest in fall and least in winter, and smaller sharks have a more varied diet than larger ones. In the northern Gulf of Mexico, the most important prey species are Atlantic croaker (Micropogonias undulatus), longspine porgy (Stenotomus caprinus), spot croaker (Leiostomus xanthurus), Gulf butterfish (Peprilus burti), red goatfish (Mullus auratus), dwarf goatfish (Upeneus parvus), and longfin inshore squid (Doryteuthis pealeii). The relative importance of each differs across seasons (for example, squid are more important in winter), perhaps due to seasonal variation in their availability. A known parasite of the sand devil is the copepod Eudactylina spinula.

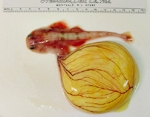
Sand devil embryo with external yolk sac.

Like other angel sharks, the sand devil is viviparous with the developing embryos sustained by yolk. Mature females have one functional ovary, on the left, and two functional uteruses. Mating occurs in the spring; adult males have spines on the outer margins of their pectoral fins, which may help in gripping the female during copulation. Females reproduce no more than once every two years, perhaps longer. Litter size varies from four to 25 pups, and does not appear related to the size of the female. The gestation period lasts roughly 12 months, and birthing occurs between February and June at depths of 20–30 m (66–98 ft). The newborns measure 25–30 cm (9.8–11.8 in) in length. Males and females sexually mature at around 93 and 86 cm (37 and 34 in) long respectively; the fact that females mature at a smaller size than males is unusual among sharks.

== Human interactions ==
Though not normally aggressive towards humans, the sand devil can inflict serious wounds if provoked. Its common name refers to its habit of snapping vigorously at fishery workers when caught, and even out of the water it is capable of lunging upwards to bite. This shark is caught incidentally in bottom trawls operated by commercial fisheries targeting other species. It is edible but seldom brought to market. The International Union for Conservation of Nature (IUCN) presently rates this species as least concern.
