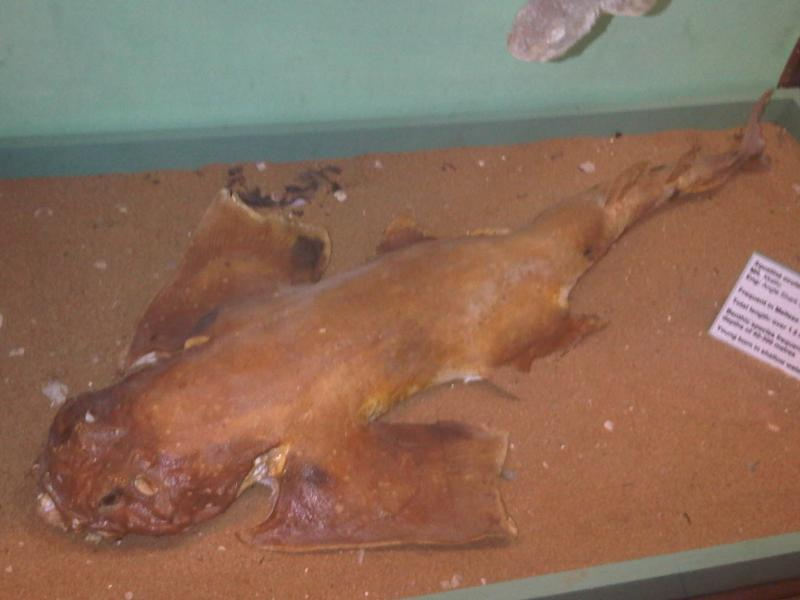

Conservation status
- Critically Endangered (IUCN 3.1)

Scientific classification
- Kingdom: Animalia
- Phylum: Chordata
- Class: Chondrichthyes
- Subclass: Elasmobranchii
- Division: Selachii
- Order: Squatiniformes
- Family: Squatinidae
- Genus: Squatina
- Species: S. oculata

Binomial name
- Squatina oculata Bonaparte, 1840
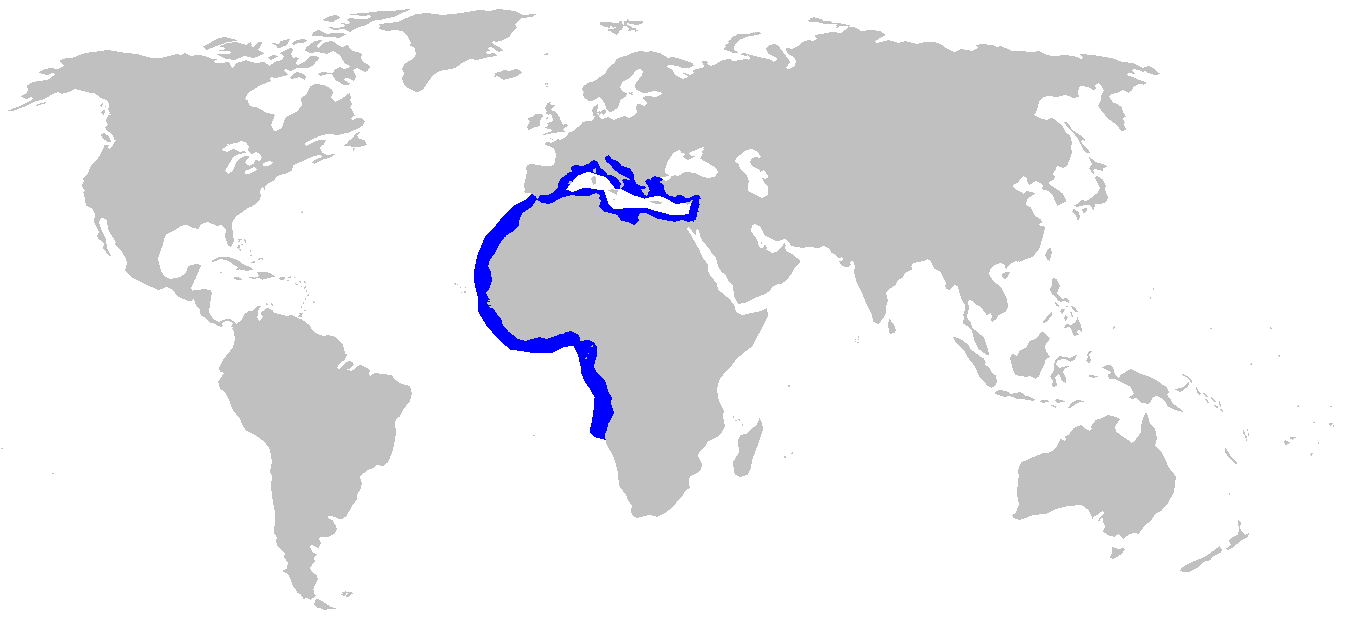
- Range of smoothback angelshark (in blue)

= Smoothback angelshark =

Species of shark

The smoothback angelshark (Squatina oculata) is an angelshark of the family Squatinidae found in the eastern Atlantic and Mediterranean.

== Description ==
The smoothback angelshark can reach a length of up to 1.6 metres. As with other angelsharks, its body is flattened by very wide pectoral fins, giving it the appearance of a long ray. Unlike in rays, however, the pectoral fins are clearly separated from the body. They have two dorsal fins and no anal fin. The shark is grey-brown with small, round black and white spots and a distinctive white neck spot. The bases and tips of the pectoral fins have symmetrical dark spots, as well as the base of the tail and the lower edge of the dorsal fins. Eyespots with white edges may be present. The outer edges of the dorsal and caudal fins are white, those of the thoracic and pelvic fins dark. Enlarged spines are located in the snout area and around the eyes, but not on the back.

The eyes are on the top of the head with a strong concave surface between them. The outer nostrils are covered with short barbels. The spiracles are large. There are five lateral, lower gill openings. The nasal valves are either only slightly fringed or smoothly edged, the barbels either forked or lobed.

== Distribution ==
The smoothback angelshark is found on Africa's western coast down to Namibia, as well as in the Mediterranean. It lives in the outer margins of the continental shelf at depths between 20 and 500 meters, although it usually resides in depths above 100 meters.

== Biology ==
The data for the biology of this species is limited. It is known to feed on small sharks, bony fish, cephalopods and crabs. Like all angelsharks it is ovoviviparous. The pups are 24–27 centimetres long at birth.

== Threats and relationship with humans ==
The smoothback angelshark is critically endangered. Like the sawback angelshark (Squatina aculeata) found in the same habitat, this species used to be very common. It is most threatened by the intensive fishing in coastal areas and continental shelves by drift nets, gillnets and longlines, which affects most of its range off the African coast. The sharks are caught as by-catch, causing the stock to plummet dramatically in the last 50 years. The species has therefore disappeared in large areas of the northern Mediterranean and in African coastal waters. Together with two related species, the sawback angelshark and the angelshark, the Portuguese fisheries authorities in the area off Morocco and Mauritania saw a fall of 95% between 1990 and 1998. The pressure of fisheries on the species distribution is likely to intensify in the future.
