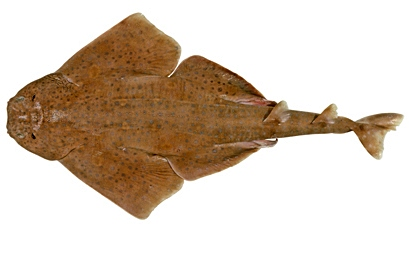

Conservation status
- Least Concern (IUCN 3.1)

Scientific classification
- Kingdom: Animalia
- Phylum: Chordata
- Class: Chondrichthyes
- Subclass: Elasmobranchii
- Division: Selachii
- Order: Squatiniformes
- Family: Squatinidae
- Genus: Squatina
- Species: S. pseudocellata

Binomial name
- Squatina pseudocellata Last & W. T. White, 2008
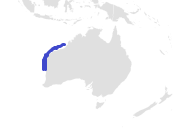
- Range of the Western angelshark

= Western angelshark =

Species of shark

The western angelshark (Squatina pseudocellata) is an angelshark of the family Squatinidae found on the tropical outer continental shelf off northern Western Australia, at depths of 130 to 310 metres (430 to 1,020 ft). Its length is up to 64 centimetres (25 in).

Reproduction is ovoviviparous, with up to 20 pups in a litter.
