= Squatina leae =

Scientific classification
- Kingdom: Animalia
- Phylum: Chordata
- Class: Chondrichthyes
- Subclass: Elasmobranchii
- Division: Selachii
- Order: Squatiniformes
- Family: Squatinidae
- Genus: Squatina
- Species: S. leae

Binomial name
- Squatina leae Weigmann, Vaz, Akhilesh, Leeney & Naylor 2023

Species of shark

Squatina leae, commonly known as Lea's angel shark, is a species of deep-water angelshark restricted to the Saya de Malha Bank, that may possibly inhabit waters around the Indian Ocean. The species was described with young specimens captured in deep waters in the region. The etymology of the genus Squatina comes from the Latin, squatum, the name given to angelsharks. Leae is a tribute to Lea-Marie Cordt, late sister of the first author’s fiancée.
