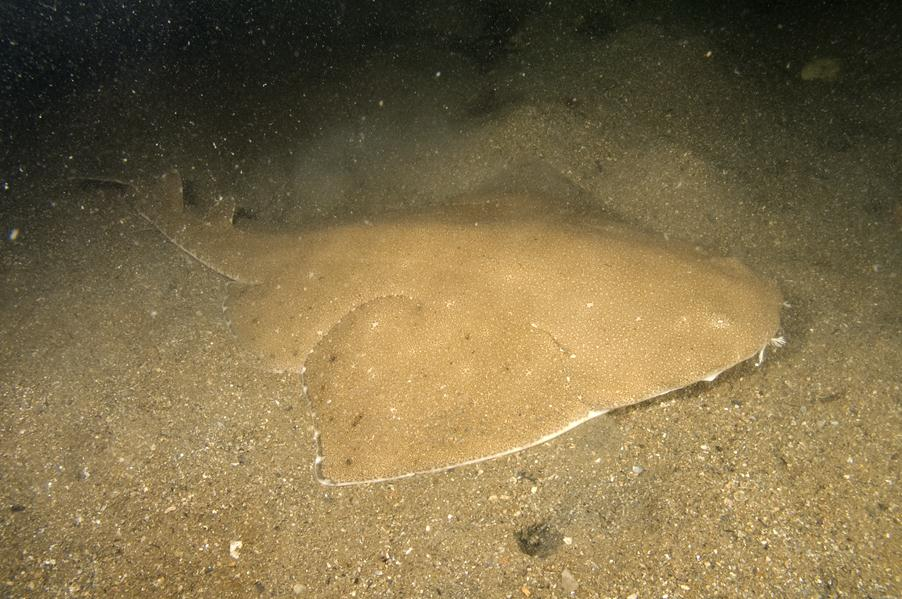

Conservation status
- Least Concern (IUCN 3.1)

Scientific classification
- Kingdom: Animalia
- Phylum: Chordata
- Class: Chondrichthyes
- Subclass: Elasmobranchii
- Division: Selachii
- Order: Squatiniformes
- Family: Squatinidae
- Genus: Squatina
- Species: S. australis

Binomial name
- Squatina australis Regan, 1906
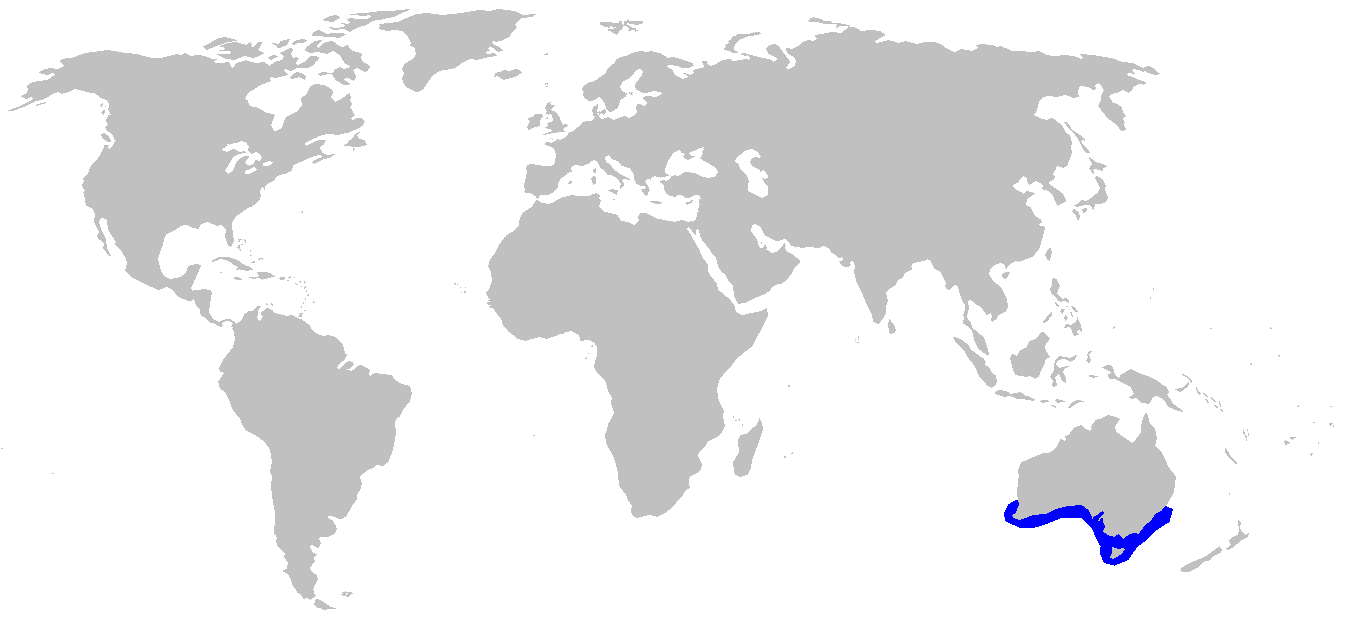
- Range of the Australian angelshark

= Australian angelshark =

Species of shark

The Australian angelshark (Squatina australis) is a species of angelshark, family Squatinidae, found in the subtropical waters of southern Australia from Western Australia to New South Wales between latitudes 18°S and 41°S, at depths down to 255 m (840 ft). Its length is up to 1.52 m (5 ft). Reproduction is ovoviviparous, with up to 20 pups in a litter.

== Description ==
The Australian angelshark has a broad, vertically compressed body and large triangular pectoral fins with free trailing flaps. The snout has fringed barbels beside the nostrils and a pair of spiracles. Each of these is set at a distance from the eye of about one and a half times the diameter of the eye. There are two small dorsal fins set far back and the tail fin is small. The maximum length is about 152 centimetres (60 in) and this shark has no large eyespots on the body. Male individuals are fully mature at around 800 millimetres (31 in) total length.

== Distribution and habitat ==
The Australian angelshark is native to the continental shelf of southern Australia being found along the coasts of Western Australia, South Australia, Victoria, Tasmania and New South Wales at depths down to about 130 metres (430 ft). It is usually found on sandy or muddy seabeds and in seagrass meadows, often close to rocky reefs.

== Behaviour ==
The Australian angelshark lies semi-submerged in the sediment on the seabed during the day, eating anything that comes too close. It emerges at night to actively seek out prey. Its diet consists of small fish, crustaceans and other invertebrates.

This shark is ovoviviparous, retaining its developing embryos in its oviduct, with a litter of up to twenty young being born. Little is known of its breeding habits, but the closely related Pacific angelshark (Squatina californica) has a gestation period of about ten months.

== Status ==
The Australian angelshark is listed by the IUCN in its Red List of Threatened Species as being of "Least Concern". This is because the population size is large and appears to be stable. The fish is used for food, being marketed under the name of "monkfish", but is not easily caught by line-fishing or netting because of its habit of lying immersed in the sediment but can be caught by dragging a trawl across the seabed.
