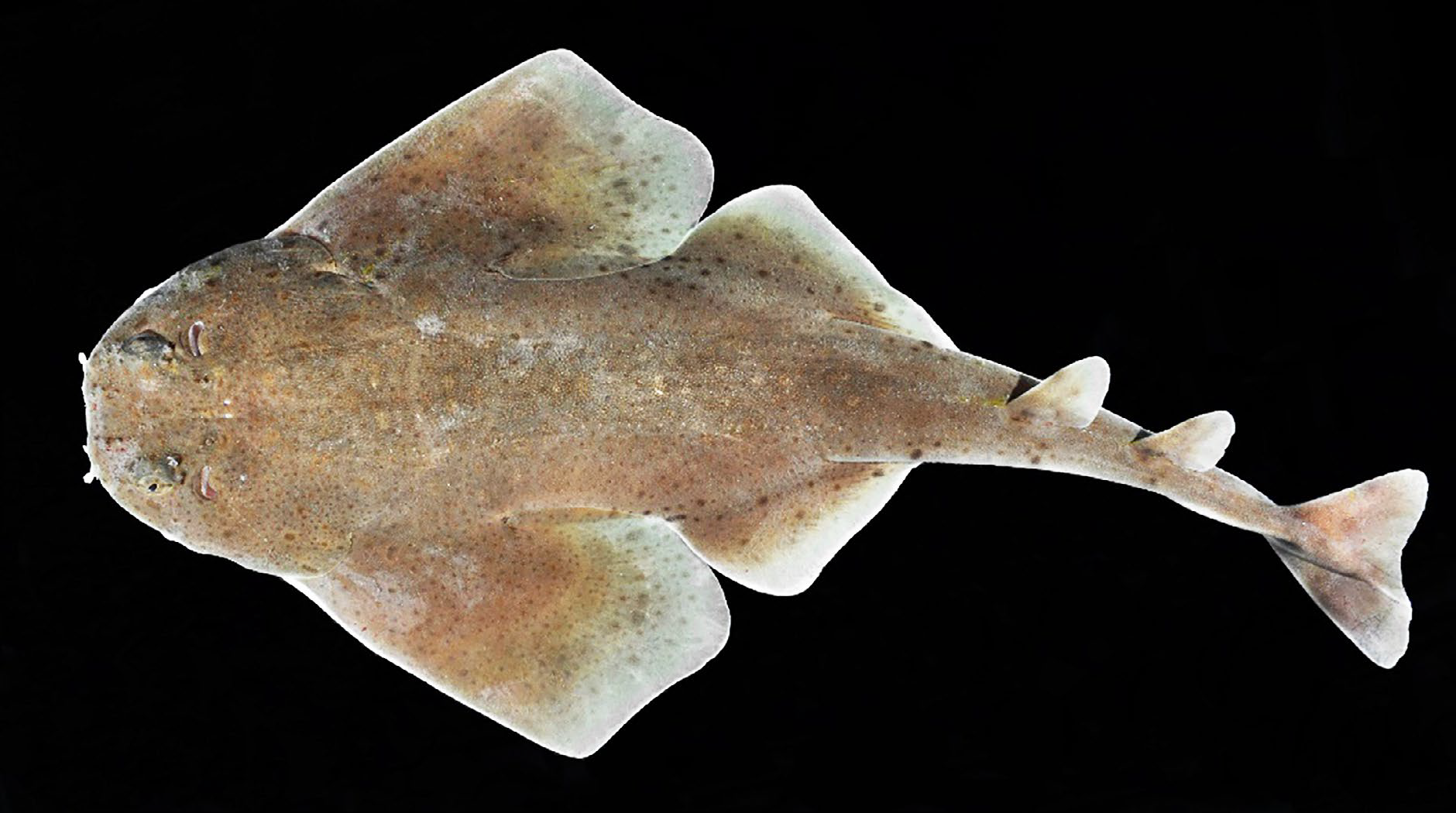
- Fresh holotype (USNM 400784), an immature male, dorsal view
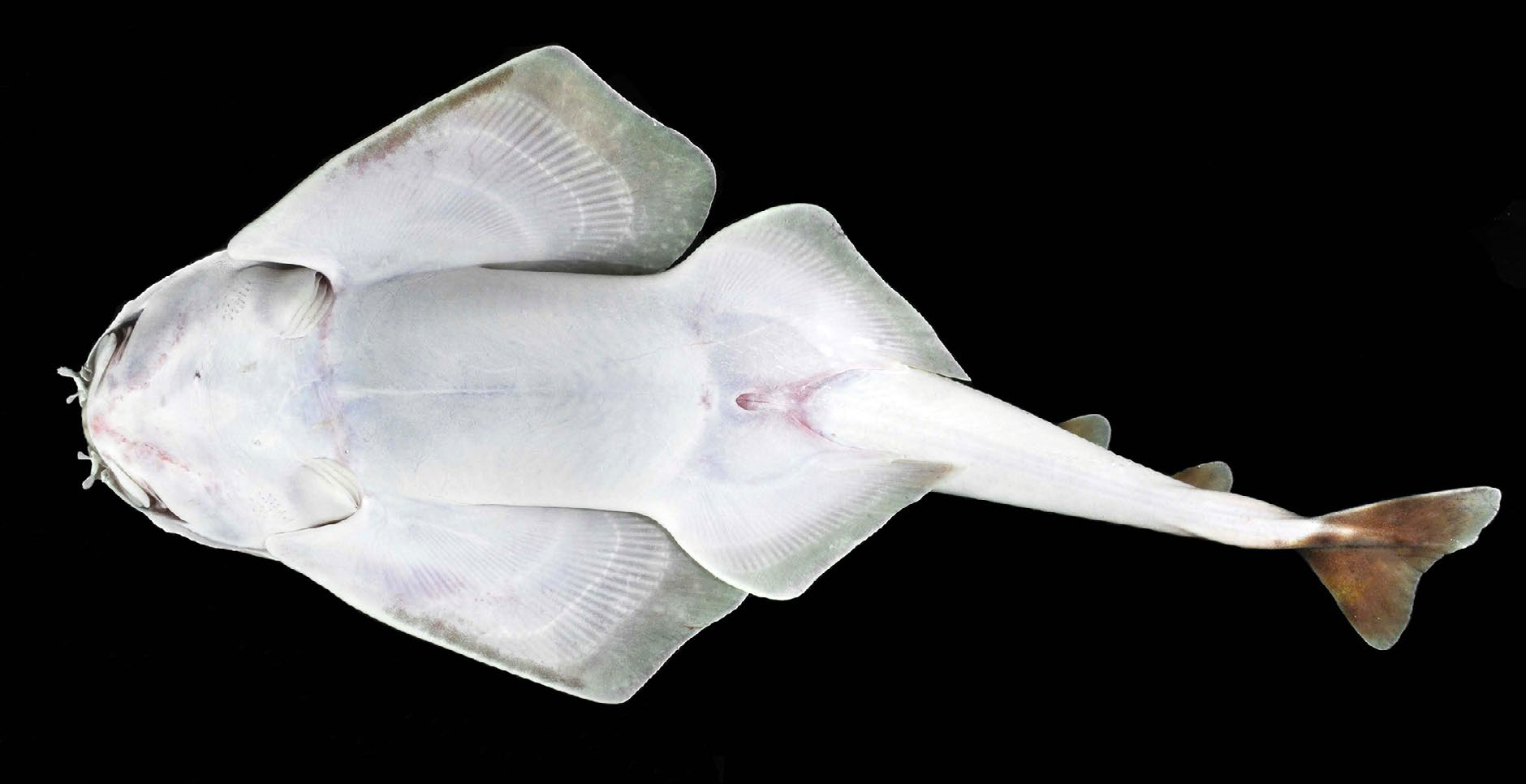
- Fresh holotype, ventral view

Scientific classification
- Kingdom: Animalia
- Phylum: Chordata
- Class: Chondrichthyes
- Subclass: Elasmobranchii
- Division: Selachii
- Order: Squatiniformes
- Family: Squatinidae
- Genus: Squatina
- Species: S. mapama

Binomial name
- Squatina mapama Long, Ebert, Tavera, Acero P., and Robertson, 2021
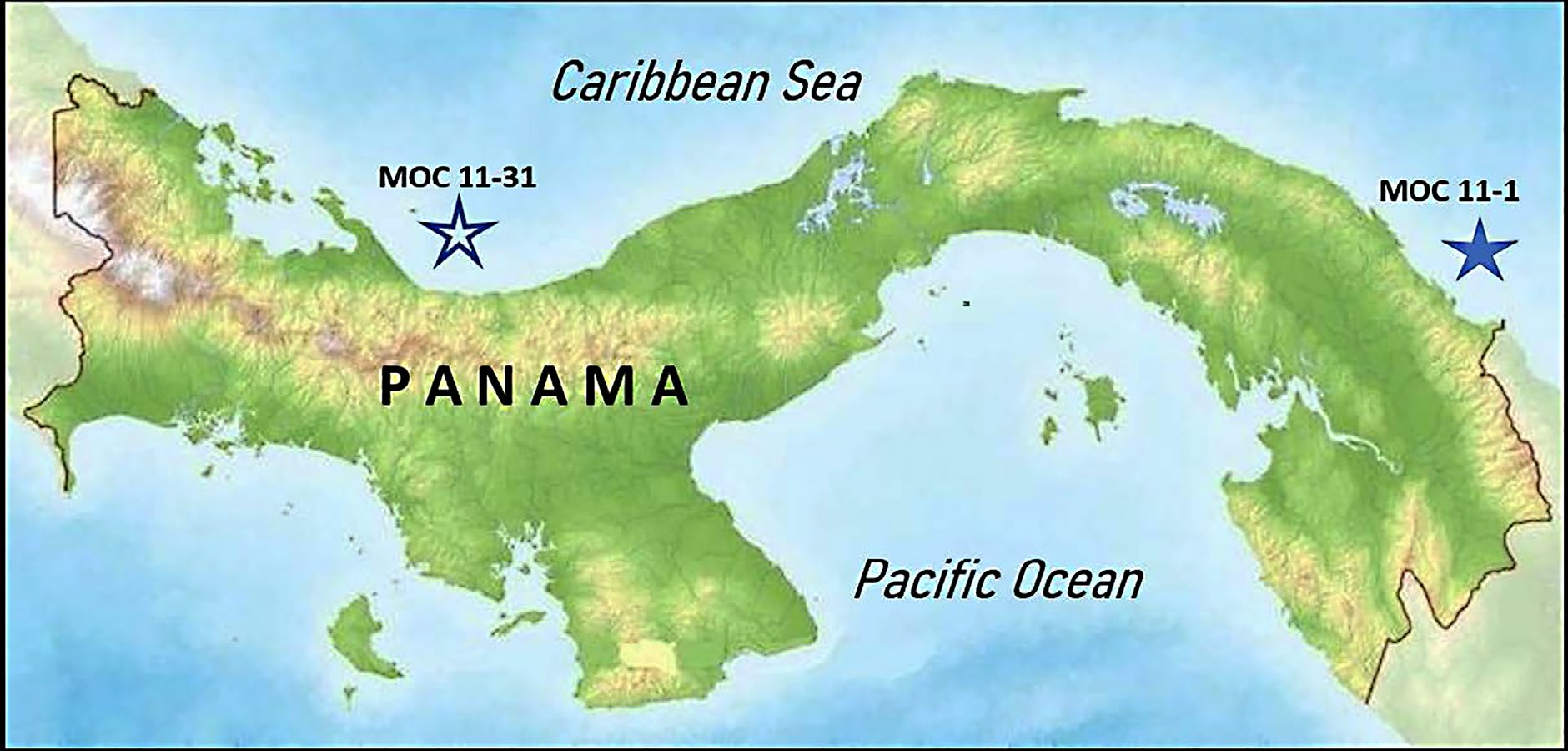
- Map of Panama showing the capture location of the type specimens (MOC11-31, marked with an unfilled star)

= Squatina mapama =

Species of angelshark

Squatina mapama (also known as the small-crested angelshark) is a species of angelshark found in the Caribbean. It was described by Douglas J. Long, David A. Ebert, Jose Tavera, Arturo Acero Pizarro, and David Ross Robertson in December 2021.

== Description ==
S. mapama, like all Squatina (angelsharks), has a wide and flat body resembling that of rays.

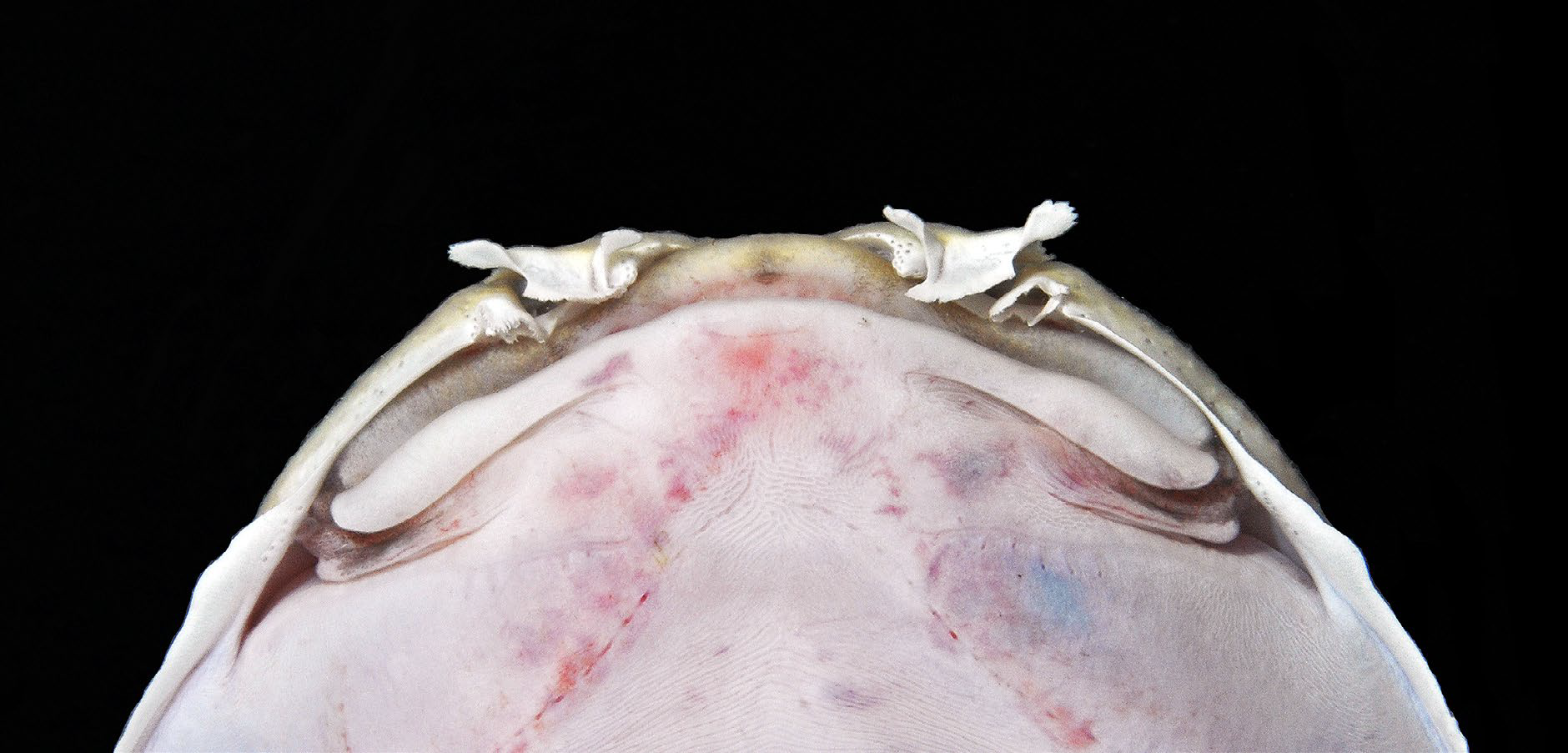
Detail of nasal flaps of the fresh holotype

Its head length ranges from 16.5% to 17.5% of its total length (TL), and its head width is about 22.2% of TL, with the maximum head width just anterior of its gill opening. Its eyes are "wide-set, small, and oblong", with an orbit width of 2.3% to 2.9% of TL. Its mouth is "moderately arched", with a width of 10.5% to 12.1% of TL (four to five times its mouth height). There are "double folds in front of" each lower jaw angle and furrows extending medially from the lips, starting at the corners of the mouth. Its upper lip is semicircularly arched, and is wider than it is high; the furrows extending from it are "partially covered by dermal folds" and slightly longer than those extending from the lower lip. It has square nasal flaps protruding from the dermal folds above its mouth; they have "a fine fringe" on their ventral side. Its nasal barbels are short, flat, and round; its nostrils are large, vertically narrow, and flat.

It has large, "moderately angular" pectoral fins, with a length of about 34.0% to 34.5% of TL, and 37 or 38 radials. Its pelvic fins are "broadly triangular", with 26 to 28 radials. Its dorsal fins are small, with round tips. The first dorsal fin has a length of 6.3% to 7.2% of TL and a base of 3.8% to 4.0% of TL; it is slightly longer than the second dorsal fin, which has a length of 6.0% to 6.8% of TL and a base of 3.2% to 3.8% of TL. Its caudal peduncle is flat, with only a small ridge on each side. Its caudal fin is triangular, with a concave posterior edge, and an upper lobe length of 81% of the lower lobe length.

It has 137 vertebrae, including 105 precaudal vertebrae (in front of the tail), 47 monospondylous vertebrae, 32 or 33 diplospondylous vertebrae to the start of the caudal fin, and 26 or 27 diplospondylous vertebrae to the start of the first dorsal fin.

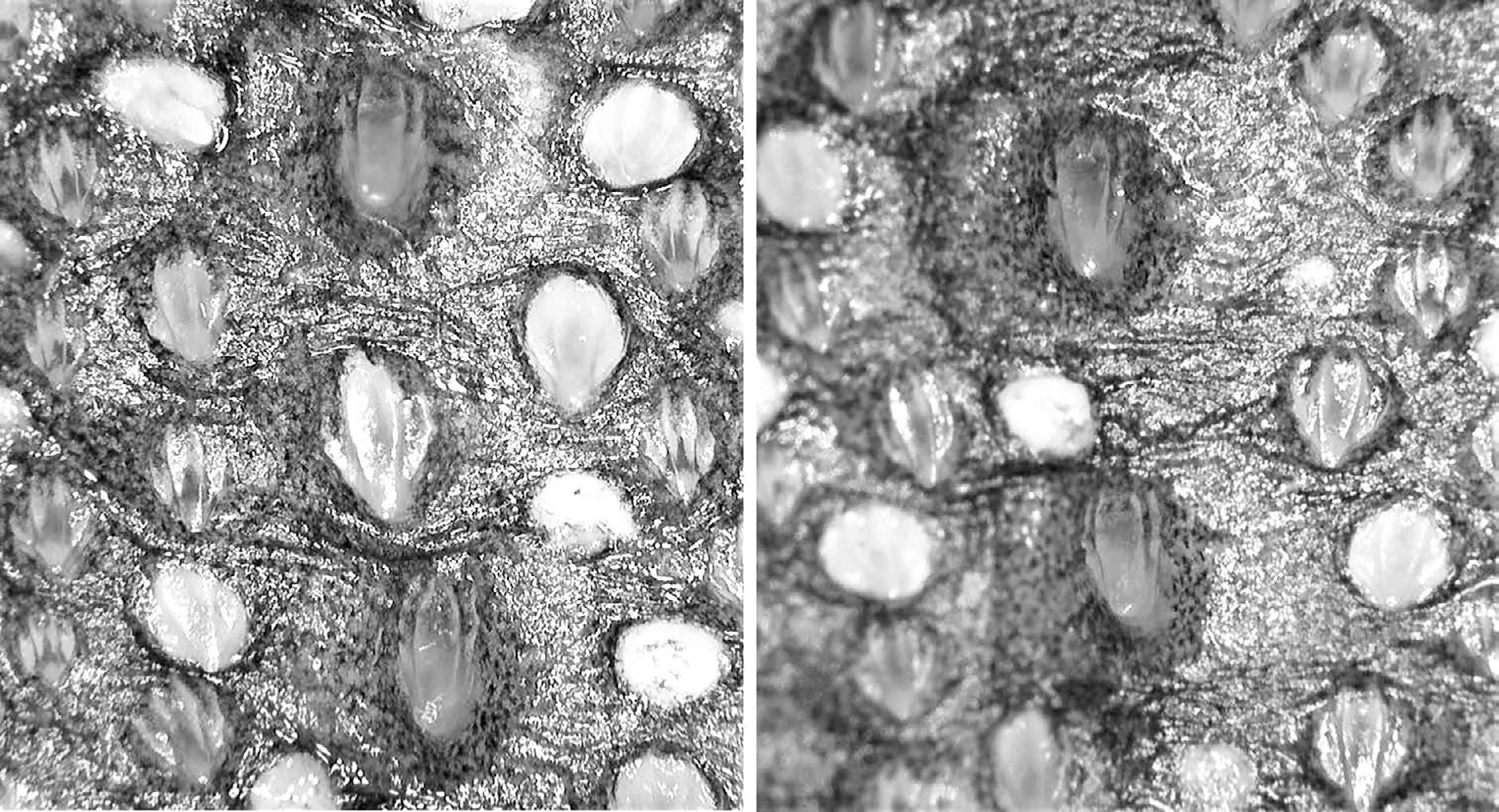
Photomicrograph of the enlarged dermal denticles at the dorsal midline (central vertical row in each) of the preserved holotype (left) and paratype (right)

The entire dorsal (upper) side of S. mapama is covered in fine dermal denticles, but the ventral (lower) side only has denticles on the anterolateral edge (forward and on the side) of the pectoral and pelvic fins. There is a short row of slightly enlarged denticles (no more than 50% larger than those adjacent to them) along the midline of the dorsal side, and some additional enlarged denticles on the head.

The holotype's total length is 400 mm (16 in), and the paratype's is 325 mm (12.8 in), but the maximum total length is longer because both specimens are immature males.

== Range ==
As of December 2021, when S. mapama was described, it is only known by its type specimens, which were collected off the western Caribbean coast of Panama.

== Etymology ==
S. mapama's specific epithet was named after the Spanish Ministry of Agriculture and Fisheries, Food and Environment (Spanish: Ministerio de Agricultura y Pesca, Alimentación y Medio Ambiente, abbreviated as MAPAMA) for its support of the research which led to the species's discovery.

Its suggested common name, "small-crested angelshark", refers to the distinguishing line of dermal denticles on its dorsal side.
