= Vari's angelshark =

Conservation status
- Least Concern (IUCN 3.1)

Scientific classification
- Kingdom: Animalia
- Phylum: Chordata
- Class: Chondrichthyes
- Subclass: Elasmobranchii
- Division: Selachii
- Order: Squatiniformes
- Family: Squatinidae
- Genus: Squatina
- Species: S. varii

Binomial name
- Squatina varii Vaz & Carvalho, 2018
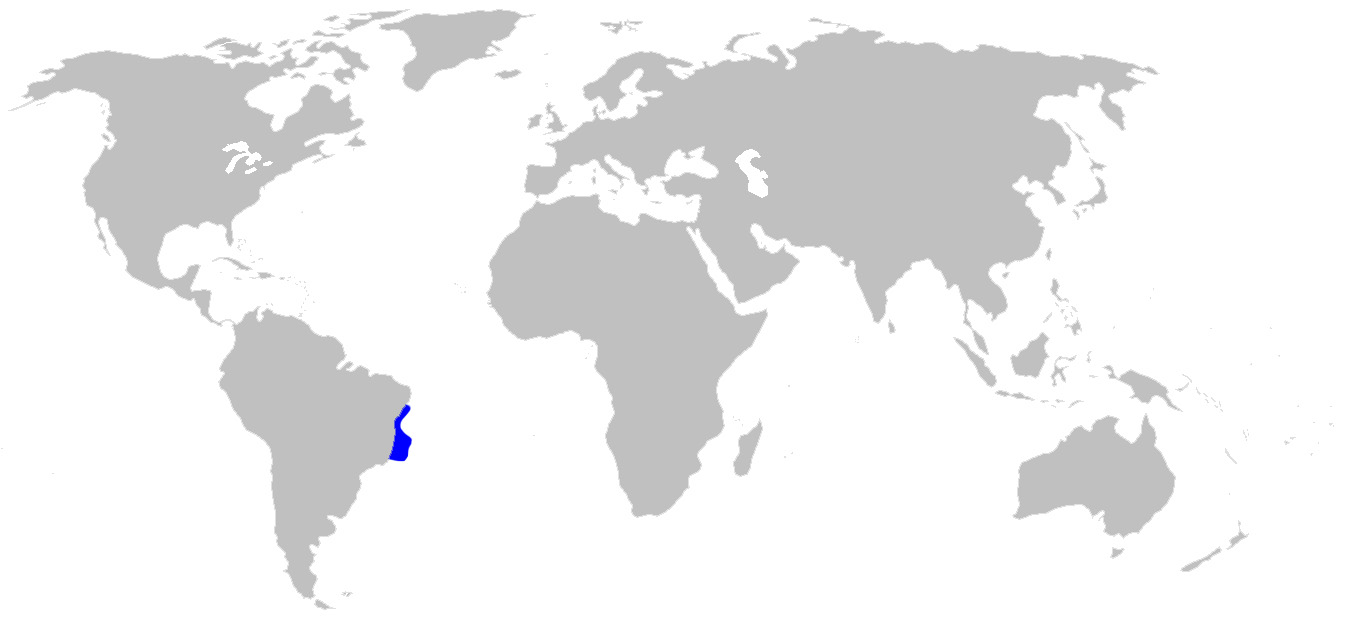
- Range of Vari's angelshark

Species of angelshark

Vari's angelshark (Squatina varii) is an angelshark in the family Squatinidae found in Southwestern Atlantic, specifically Brazil. It lives in the continental slope between latitudes 11° and 22°S, at the depths of 195–666 m (640–2,185 ft).

== Description ==
This species differs from other Southwestern Atlantic angel sharks in terms of several characteristics comparison, such as dorsal coloration, vertebral counts, dermal denticles, and pectoral fin feature. The reproduction system is viviparous. The maximum length for the females is 132 cm (52 in) and the males is around 120 cm (47 in).

== Habitat and distribution ==
Vari's angelshark inhabits continental shelf of eastern Brazil, ranging from Rio de Janeiro State to Sergipe State. It presumably lives at depths of maximum 666 m (2,185 ft). There are no deep-water Brazilian fisheries operating at those depths and thus saving this angelshark from possible exploitation.
