= Squatina caillieti =

Conservation status
- Data Deficient (IUCN 3.1)

Scientific classification
- Kingdom: Animalia
- Phylum: Chordata
- Class: Chondrichthyes
- Subclass: Elasmobranchii
- Division: Selachii
- Order: Squatiniformes
- Family: Squatinidae
- Genus: Squatina
- Species: S. caillieti

Binomial name
- Squatina caillieti J. H. Walsh, Ebert & Compagno, 2011

Species of shark

The Philippines angelshark (Squatina caillieti) is a species of angelshark, family Squatinidae, known only from a 33 cm (13 in) long immature female caught in the Philippines, where it is the only known representative of its family. It has a flattened body and head with greatly expanded pectoral and pelvic fins, and is greenish above with brown spots. Identifying traits of this species include the spiracles, which are more widely spaced than the eyes and bear papillae (nipple-shaped structures) on the posterior inner rims, and the relative positions of the two dorsal fins. Additionally, S. caillieti lacks fringes on its barbels, enlarged thorns along the middle of its back, and ocelli ("eyespots") on its fins.

== Taxonomy ==
The holotype (and only known specimen) of S. caillieti is an immature female collected on September 23, 1995 by Leonard Compagno and Peter Last. It was originally identified tentatively as a Taiwan angelshark (S. formosa), before being described as a new species by Jonathan Walsh, David Ebert, and Leonard Compagno in a 2011 issue of the scientific journal Zootaxa. It was named in honor of ichthyologist Gregor Cailliet, particularly known for his studies of growth and aging in cartilaginous fishes.

== Distribution and habitat ==
The single S. caillieti specimen was collected by trawl from a depth of 363–385 m (1,191–1,263 ft), southeast of the island of Luzon. It is the only species of angel shark known to occur in the Philippines.

== Description ==
Like other angel sharks, S. caillieti has a flattened, ray-like form with greatly enlarged pectoral and pelvic fins. The horizontal edges of the broad, rounded head bear enlarged folds of skin. The large nostrils are teardrop-shaped and preceded by flaps of skin enlarged into two cylindrical barbels that overhang the mouth. The eyes are horizontally oval and placed relatively close together. Behind the eyes are crescent-shaped spiracles, which are spaced further apart than the eyes and bear prominent papillae (nipple-shaped structures) along their posterior inner rims. The mouth is wide and terminally placed on the snout, with furrows at the corners and the center of the upper lip forming a rounded arch. The upper and lower jaws contain 10 and 9 tooth rows respectively on either side; the teeth are small, conical, and sharp. The five pairs of gill slits are laterally situated on the head.

The pectoral fins have straight leading margins and rounded outer corners, that form an angle slightly over 120°. The anterior lobes of the pectoral fins are free from the head. The pelvic fins are roughly triangular and about three-quarters as long as the pectoral fins; the pelvic fin rear tips are approximately even with the origin of the first dorsal fin. The two dorsal fins are similar in shape, with the first slightly larger than the second. Both have straight leading margins and somewhat angular apexes. The space between the dorsal fins is greater than the space between the second dorsal and caudal fins. The caudal peduncle is flattened and expanded laterally to form keels. The lower lobe of the caudal fin is markedly larger than the upper. A moderately rough covering of dermal denticles is present over the upper surface and both dorsal fins; the underside is mostly smooth, except along the pectoral and pelvic fin margins. This species is greenish brown above with many round, pale-edged brown spots, black saddles below the dorsal fin bases, and white pelvic fin edges. It is plain white below. The sole specimen measures 33 cm (13 in) long.

== Human interactions ==
The conservation status of S. caillieti has not yet been evaluated by the International Union for Conservation of Nature (IUCN).
