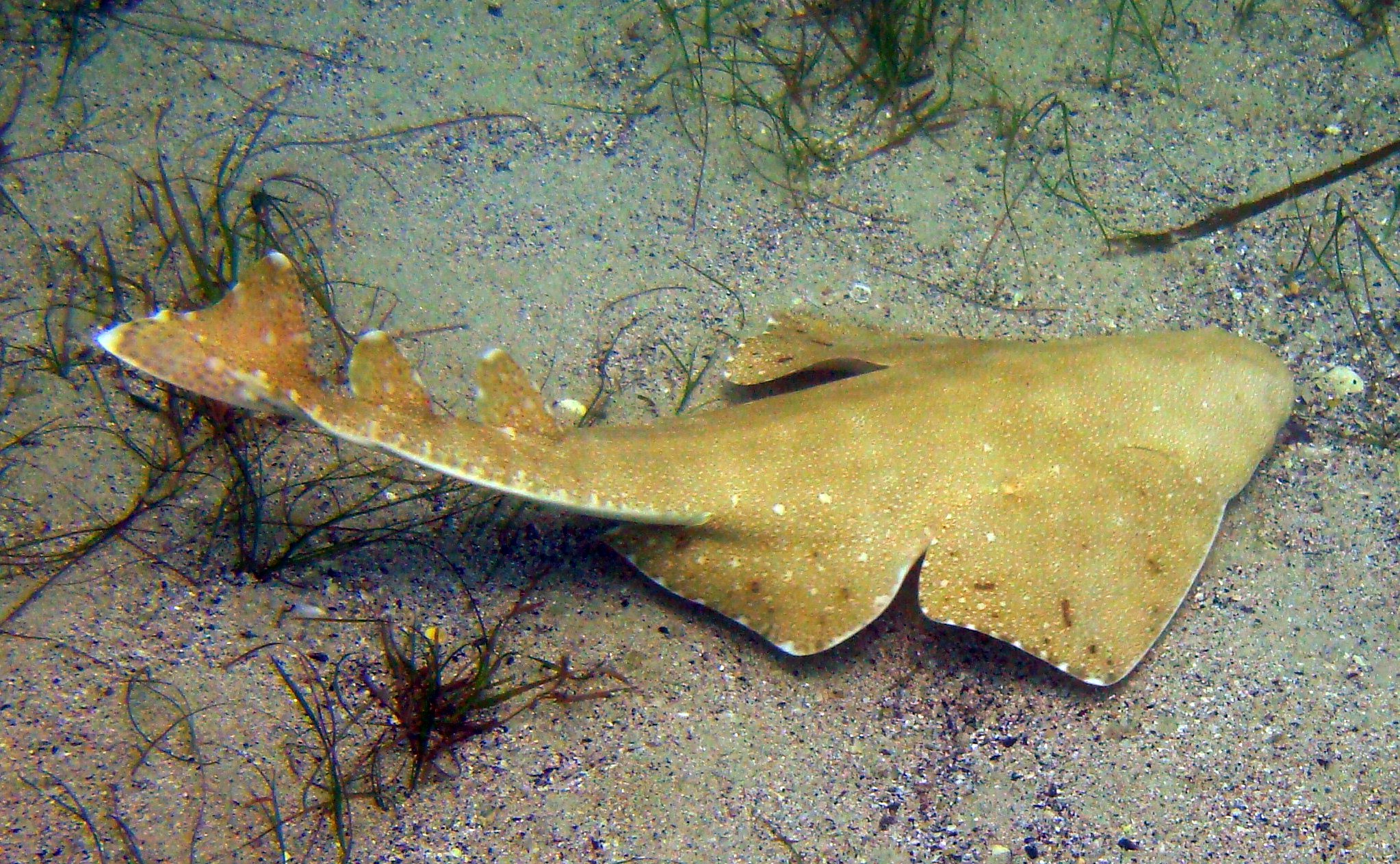
- Australian angelshark (Squatina australis)
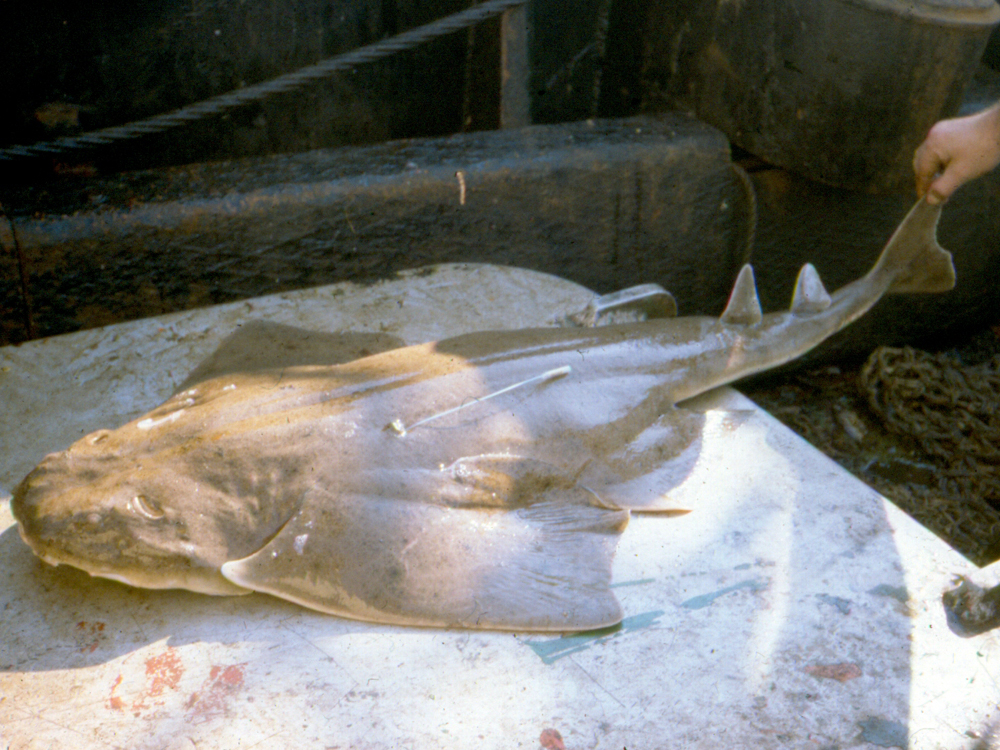
- Sand devil (Squatina dumeril)

Scientific classification
- Kingdom: Animalia
- Phylum: Chordata
- Class: Chondrichthyes
- Subclass: Elasmobranchii
- Division: Selachii
- Superorder: Squalomorphi
- Series: Squatinida
- Order: Squatiniformes
- Family: Squatinidae
- Genus: Squatina; Duméril, 1806

Type species
- Squalus squatina Linnaeus, 1758

Synonyms
- Squalraia De la Pylaie, 1835

= Angelshark =

Angel shark Temporal range: Aptian–Recent

Genus of sharks

Angelsharks, off the coast of Fuerteventura

Angel sharks are sharks belonging to the genus Squatina. They are the only living members of the family Squatinidae and order Squatiniformes. They commonly inhabit sandy seabeds close to 150 m (490 ft) in depth.

Squatina and other Squatiniformes differ from other sharks in having flattened bodies and broad pectoral fins that give them a strong resemblance to rays. They occur worldwide in temperate and tropical seas. Most species inhabit shallow temperate or tropical seas, but a few species inhabit deeper water, down to 1,300 m (4,300 ft). Angel sharks are sometimes called monkfish, although this name is also applied to members of the genus Lophius.

While some species occur over a wide geographic range, the majority are restricted to a smaller area. Restriction in geographic range might be as a result of the behaviour of Squatina species, which are ambush predators with a corresponding stationary bottom-dwelling habit. Thus, trans-ocean migration is extremely unlikely, even though large-scale coastal migratory patterns have been reported in species such as Squatina squatina.

Many species are now classified as critically endangered by the International Union for Conservation of Nature. Once common over large areas of the Northeast Atlantic from Norway, Sweden, Morocco and the Canary Islands, to the Mediterranean and Black Seas, fishing pressure has resulted in significant population decline.

== Appearance and biology ==
Angel sharks grow up to 7 feet (2.1 m) and can weigh around 77 pounds (35 kg), While the anterior part of the angel shark's body is broad and flattened, the posterior part retains a muscular appearance more typical of other sharks. The eyes and spiracles are dorsal and the five gill slits are on its back. Both the pectoral and pelvic fins are large and held horizontally. There are two dorsal fins, no anal fin and unusually for sharks, the lower lobe of the caudal fin is longer than the upper lobe. Most types grow to a length of 1.5 m (5 ft), with the Japanese angel shark, known to reach 2 m. Some angel sharks have deformities that have been described in elasmobranchs. These can include skeletal deformities, as lateral spinal curvature (scoliosis), humpback curvature (khyphosis), axial spinal curvature (lordosis), missing fins, additional fins, deformed snout, and more. These abnormalities have only been found in a few sharks, but the causes of these deformities have been found to be from dietary nutritional imbalance, genetic factors, parasites, traumatic injuries, or stress in the specimen. In 2015, two sharks were captured and examined, and both showed a lateral spinal curvature (scoliosis) and also a humpback curvature. Both the animals had the curvature in the middle of their pectoral fins, but the deformity did not affect their swimming capacity.

Spinal scoliosis has been reported to be diverse in sharks, but mostly in pelagic sharks that depend on their swimming abilities to catch their prey. For the angel shark, specifically S. squatina, these curvatures do not seem to significantly affect its hunting capacity, which involves burying itself to ambush their prey. Right now, research is assuming most physical injuries are caused by human interactions because of the constant interference in coastal areas, where most of the sharks reside. There have been few attacks reported, and what few have occurred were due to accidental stepping on of buried newborn sharks. Landings of Pacific angel shark increased through the mid-1980s and reached over 1,125 tonnes in 1986, becoming the shark species with the highest total reported landings off the US West coast that year.

Angel sharks possess extensible jaws that can rapidly snap upwards to capture prey and have long, needle-like teeth. They bury themselves in loose sediment lying in wait for prey, which includes fish, crustaceans and various types of mollusks. They are ovoviviparous, producing litters of up to 13 pups. Pacific angel shark pups are born from March to June in deep water; generally 180 to 300 feet (55 and 90 metres); possibly to protect the pups from predators.

Angel sharks usually reside in depths of 1–200 metres (3.3–656.2 ft) and can be seen on muddy or soft benthic substrata where they can easily blend in as they lie in wait. Members of the family Squatinidae have a unique camouflage method, which relates to how they obtain their food, involving lying still on the sea floor, making rapid lunges at passing prey, and using negative pressure to capture prey by sucking it into their mouths.

== Species analysis ==
Morphological identification in the field can be difficult due to discontinuity and similarity of species. In this specific circumstance, the sharks' place within the genus Squatina comprises three species in the southern part of the western Atlantic. The three species observed were Squatina guggenheim, S. occulta and the Brazilian guitarfish Pseudobatos horkelii. These three species are listed in the IUCN Red List as threatened, and they are now protected under Brazilian law, which makes angling and exchange illegal. To prevent landing and trade of these endangered species along the São Paulo, DNA barcoding was used. DNA barcoding revealed fishing and trafficking of these protected species.

== Habitat ==
Angel sharks inhabit temperate and tropical marine environments. They are generally found in shallow waters at depths from 3–100 metres (9.8–328.1 ft) off coasts. They are known to bury themselves in sandy or muddy environments during the day, where they remain camouflaged for weeks until a desirable prey crosses paths with them. At night, they take a more active approach and cruise on the bottom of the floor. Squatina preys on fish, crustaceans, and cephalopods.

== Behavior ==
Although this shark is a bottom-dweller and appears harmless, it can inflict painful lacerations if provoked, due to its powerful jaws and sharp teeth. It may bite if a diver approaches the head or grabs the tail.

Angelsharks have a unique way of breathing compared to most other benthic fish. They do not pump out water from the oropharyngeal cavity like other fish. Instead they use gill flaps located under their body to pump out water during respiration. Doing so also allows them to be more discreet and prevent detection.

== Commercial value ==
Prior to the late 1980s, the Pacific angel shark was considered a "junk fish". It was a byproduct of commercial gillnetting, with no commercial appeal and was used only for crab bait. In 1977, Michael Wagner, a fish processor in Santa Barbara, California, US, in cooperation with local commercial fishermen, developed the market for angel sharks. The annual take of angel shark in 1977 was an estimated 147 kg. By 1985, the annual take of angel shark on the central California coast had increased to more than 454 tonnes or an estimated 90,000 sharks. The population declined dramatically and is now regulated. Angel sharks live very close to shore, resulting in high bycatch rates. In 1991, the use of gillnets in nearshore state waters of California was forbidden, and fishing was restricted in a larger portion of the Pacific angel shark's range.

In April 2008, the UK government afforded the angel shark full protection under the Wildlife and Countryside Act.

== Conservation ==
Once considered abundant in the Atlantic Ocean, the angel shark (Squatina squatina) was classified as "Critically Endangered" in 2010, and recent studies from the IUCN in 2019 reaffirm their CR status. Angel sharks are highly sensitive to bottom trawling and are often caught in gillnets, due to their shallow habitat range.

Angel sharks found in the Mediterranean Sea, S. aculeata, S. oculata, and S. squatina, are at a high risk of extinction, with geographic studies projecting severe population declines for the three species. The Angel Shark Conservation Network, a network established by the IUCN and Shark Trust, is working with authorities from Greece and Turkey to establish conservation strategies to protect angel shark populations in the region.

== Evolution ==
Phylogeny (A) and fossils of angel shark species, †Pseudorhina acanthoderma (B) & Squatina africana (C).

The earliest members of the Squatiniformes are known from the Late Jurassic (from around 160 million years ago) of Europe, assigned to the genus Pseudorhina. Preserved full body specimens of Pseudorhina are very similar to those of living Squatina species. The earliest records that can be assigned with confidence to the modern genus are known from the Early Cretaceous (Aptian) of England.

== Species ==
=== Extant species ===
Currently, the 26 recognized species in this genus are:

- Squatina aculeata G. Cuvier, 1829 (sawback angelshark)
- Squatina africana Regan, 1908 (African angelshark)
- Squatina albipunctata Last & W. T. White, 2008 (eastern angelshark)
- Squatina argentina (Marini, 1930) (Argentine angelshark)
- Squatina armata (Philippi {Krumweide}, 1887) (Chilean angelshark)
- Squatina australis Regan, 1906 (Australian angelshark)
- Squatina caillieti J. H. Walsh, Ebert & Compagno, 2011 (Philippines angelshark)
- Squatina californica Ayres, 1859 (Pacific angelshark)
- Squatina david Acero P, Tavera Vargas, Anguila-Gómez & Hernández-Beracasa, 2016 (David's angelshark)
- Squatina dumeril Lesueur, 1818 (sand devil)
- Squatina formosa S. C. Shen & W. H. Ting, 1972 (Taiwan angelshark)
- Squatina guggenheim Marini, 1936 (angular angelshark)
- Squatina heteroptera Castro-Aguirre, Espinoza-Pérez & Huidobro-Campos, 2007 (disparate angelshark)
- Squatina japonica Bleeker, 1858 (Japanese angelshark)
- Squatina leae Weigmann, Vaz, Akhilesh, Leeney & Naylor 2023 (Lea's angel shark)
- Squatina legnota Last & W. T. White, 2008 (Indonesian angelshark)
- Squatina mapama Long, Ebert, Tavera, Acero P., and Robertson, 2021 (Small-crested angelshark)
- Squatina mexicana Castro-Aguirre, Espinoza-Pérez & Huidobro-Campos, 2007 (Mexican angelshark)
- Squatina nebulosa Regan, 1906 (clouded angelshark)
- Squatina occulta Vooren & K. G. da Silva, 1991 (hidden angelshark)
- Squatina oculata Bonaparte, 1840 (smoothback angelshark)
- Squatina pseudocellata Last & W. T. White, 2008 (western angelshark)
- Squatina squatina (Linnaeus, 1758) (angelshark)
- Squatina tergocellata McCulloch, 1914 (ornate angelshark)
- Squatina tergocellatoides J. S. T. F. Chen, 1963 (ocellated angelshark)
- Squatina varii Vaz & Carvalho, 2018 (Brazilian angelshark)

=== Extinct species ===
The following fossil species are known:

- †Squatina angeloides Storms, 1894
- †Squatina baumbergensis von der Marck, 1885
- †Squatina beyrichi Noetling, 1885
- †Squatina carinata Giebel, 1848
- †Squatina cranei Woodward, 1888 (alternately in Cretascyllium)
- †Squatina crassa Daimeries, 1889
- †Squatina danconai Daimeries, 1889
- †Squatina decipiens Dalinkevicius, 1935
- †Squatina fortemedeo Siversson, Cook, Cederström & Ryan, 2016
- †Squatina gigantea Ameghino, 1906
- †Squatina lerichei Jordan & Beal, 1913
- †Squatina lundegreni Siversson, Cook, Cederström & Ryan, 2016
- †Squatina minor Eastman, 1911
- †Squatina moelleri Klprijanov, 1881
- †Squatina occidentalis Eastman, 1904
- †Squatina prima (Winkler, 1874)
- †Squatina subserrata (Münster, 1846)

The majority of these are known only from isolated teeth, but S. cranei and S. baumbergensis are known from well-preserved body fossils.

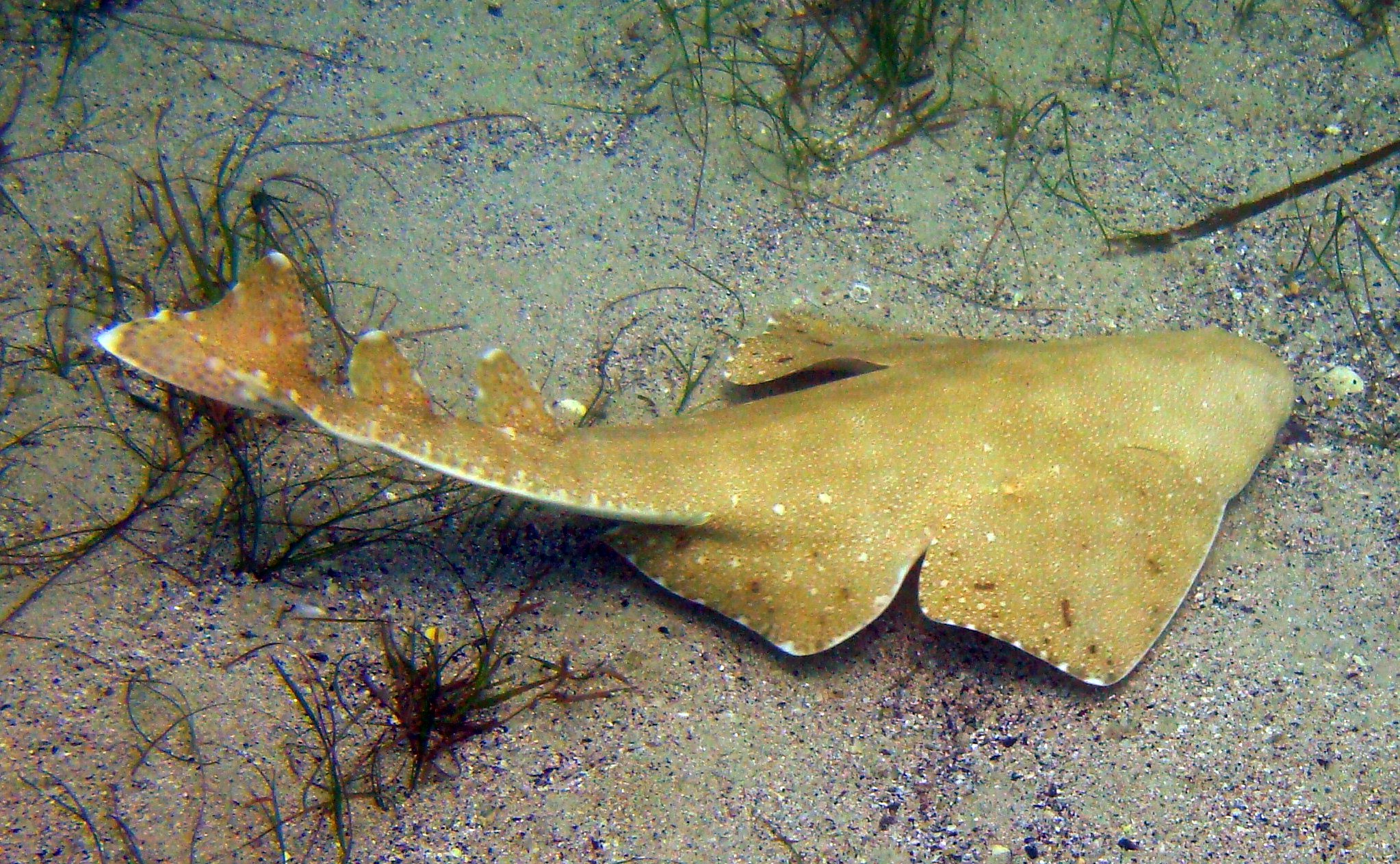
Squatina australis

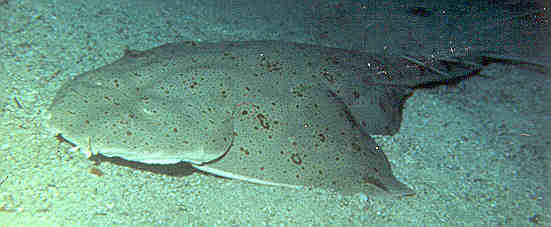
Squatina californica

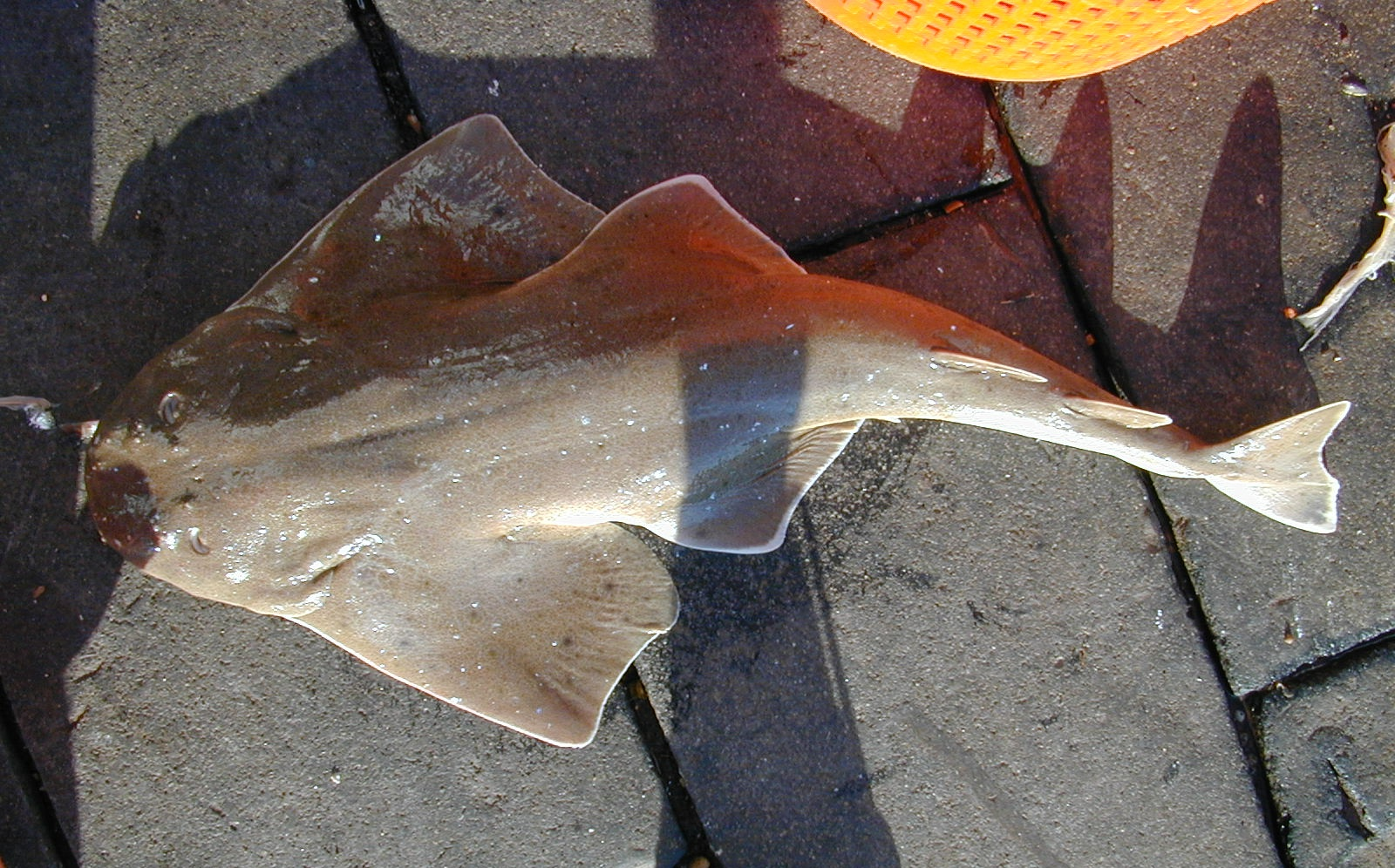
Squatina dumeril

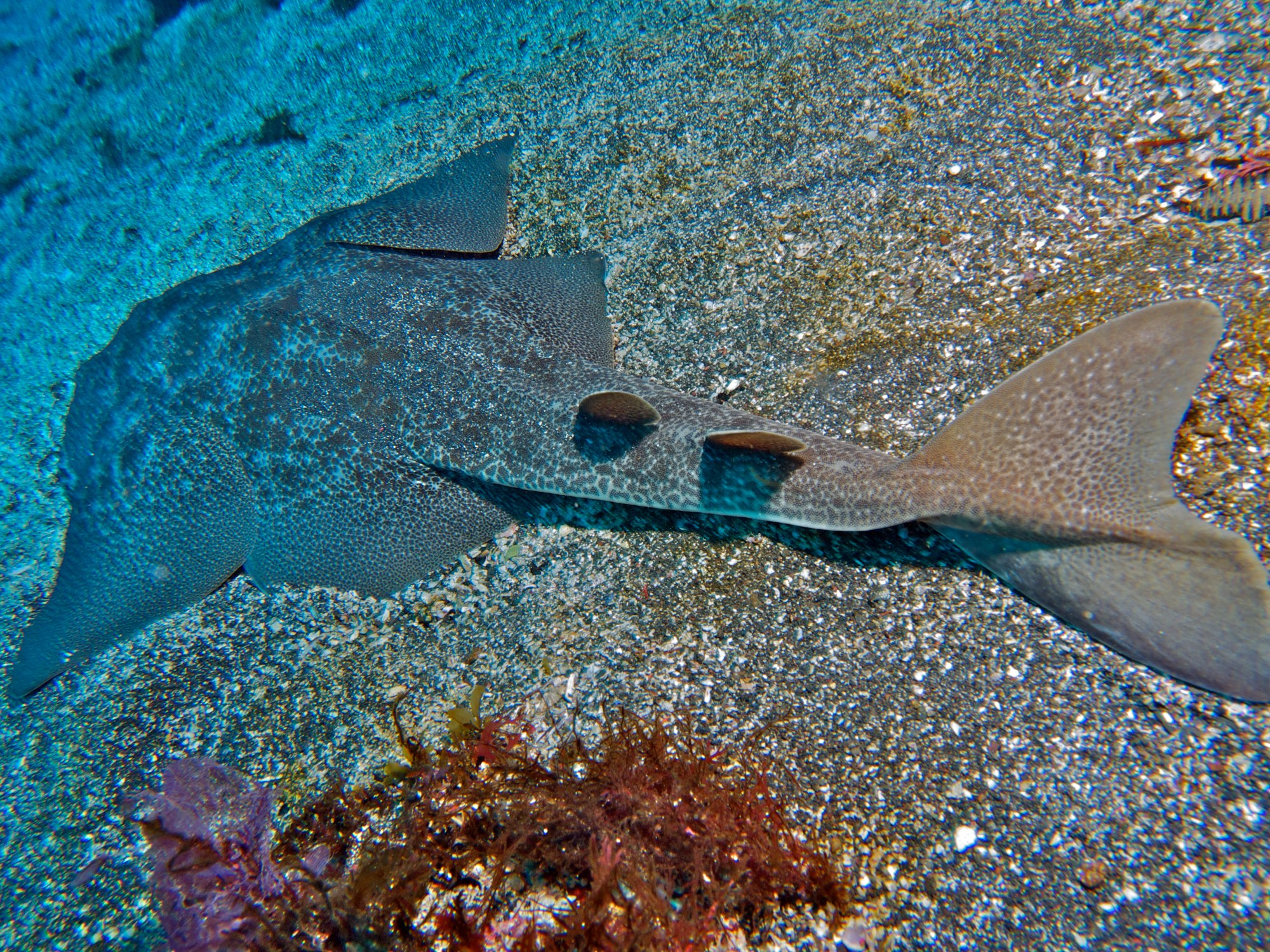
Squatina japonica

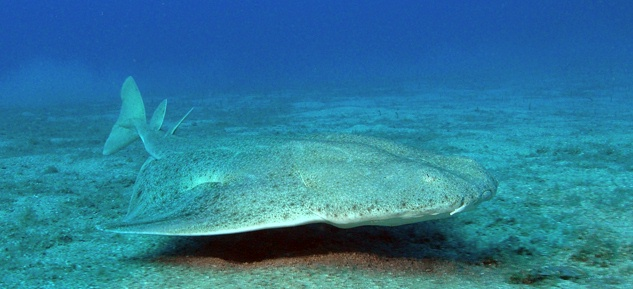
Squatina squatina

== See also ==
- List of sharks
- List of prehistoric cartilaginous fish
- Guitarfish
