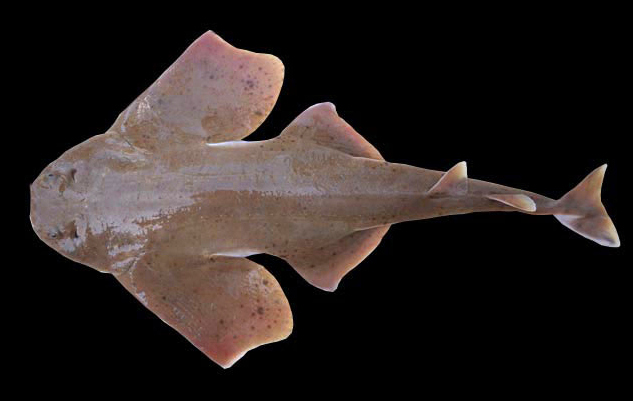

Conservation status
- Least Concern (IUCN 3.1)

Scientific classification
- Kingdom: Animalia
- Phylum: Chordata
- Class: Chondrichthyes
- Subclass: Elasmobranchii
- Division: Selachii
- Order: Squatiniformes
- Family: Squatinidae
- Genus: Squatina
- Species: S. mexicana

Binomial name
- Squatina mexicana Castro-Aguirre, Espinoza-Pérez & Huidobro-Campos, 2007
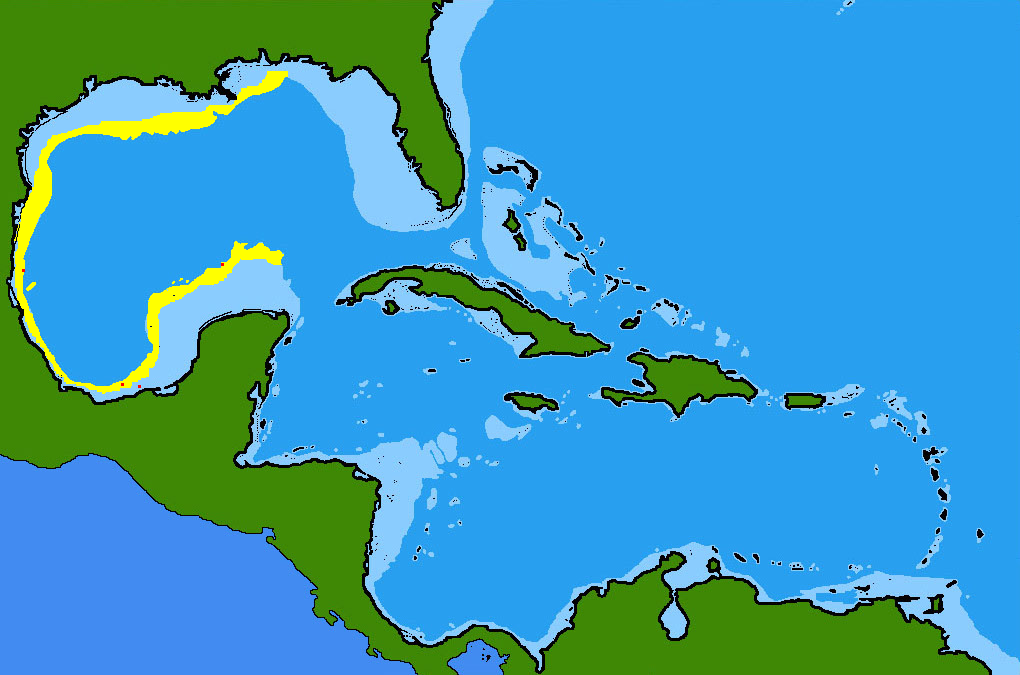

= Mexican angelshark =

Species of shark

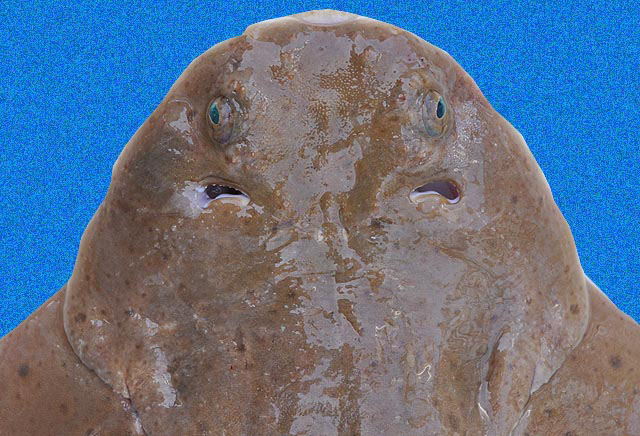
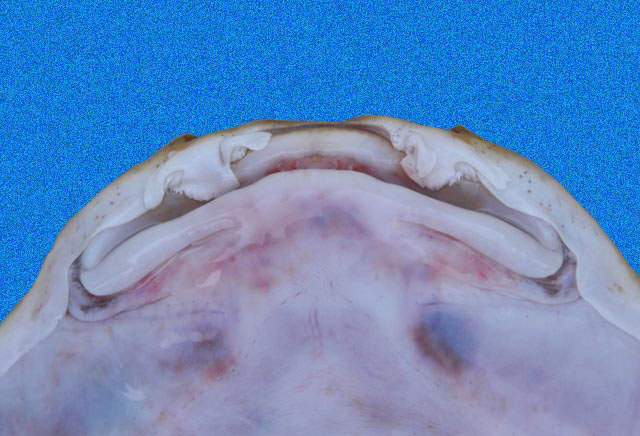
Squatina mexicana head

The Mexican angelshark (Squatina mexicana) is a species of angelshark. It occurs at depths of 70–180 m in the Gulf of Mexico and reaches a length of 88 cm (35 in).
