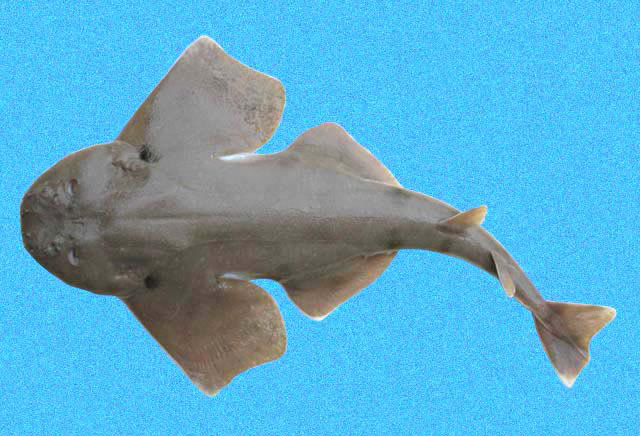

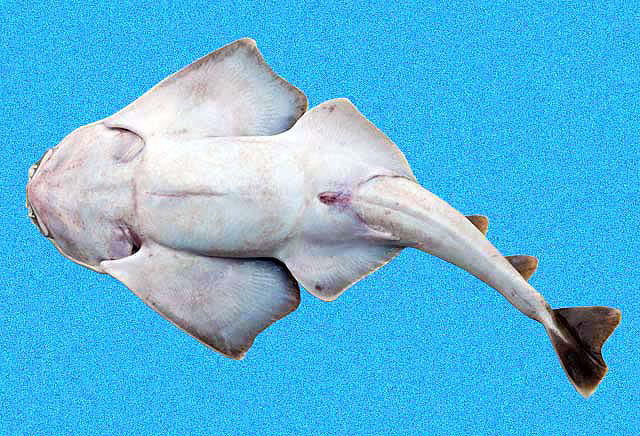

Conservation status
- Least Concern (IUCN 3.1)

Scientific classification
- Kingdom: Animalia
- Phylum: Chordata
- Class: Chondrichthyes
- Subclass: Elasmobranchii
- Division: Selachii
- Order: Squatiniformes
- Family: Squatinidae
- Genus: Squatina
- Species: S. heteroptera

Binomial name
- Squatina heteroptera Castro-Aguirre, Espinoza-Pérez & Huidobro-Campos, 2007

= Disparate angelshark =

Species of shark

The disparate angelshark (Squatina heteroptera) is a species of angelshark found along the East Coast of the United States and the Gulf of Mexico. It occurs at depths down to 1,290 m (4,230 ft) and reaches a length of 49 cm (19 in). Heteroptera in its name refers to the difference in size, shape and area of the two dorsal fins. Disparate angelsharks have the typical angel shark body form that is broadly flattened with large pectoral/pelvic fins and eyes and spiracles on the top of their heads. Their common and species name comes from them having dorsal fins of very different sizes, shapes, and areas compared to other angel sharks.

Disparate angelsharks are usually dark brown on top (dorsal surface) without any thorns or eyespots (ocelli) though they do have two distinct round black spots on the upper edge of their pectoral fins and irregular, scattered whitish spots.

== Ecology ==
Disparate angelsharks likely eat flatfish and other benthic fish, including skates, as well as crabs, shrimp, squid, and octopus.
