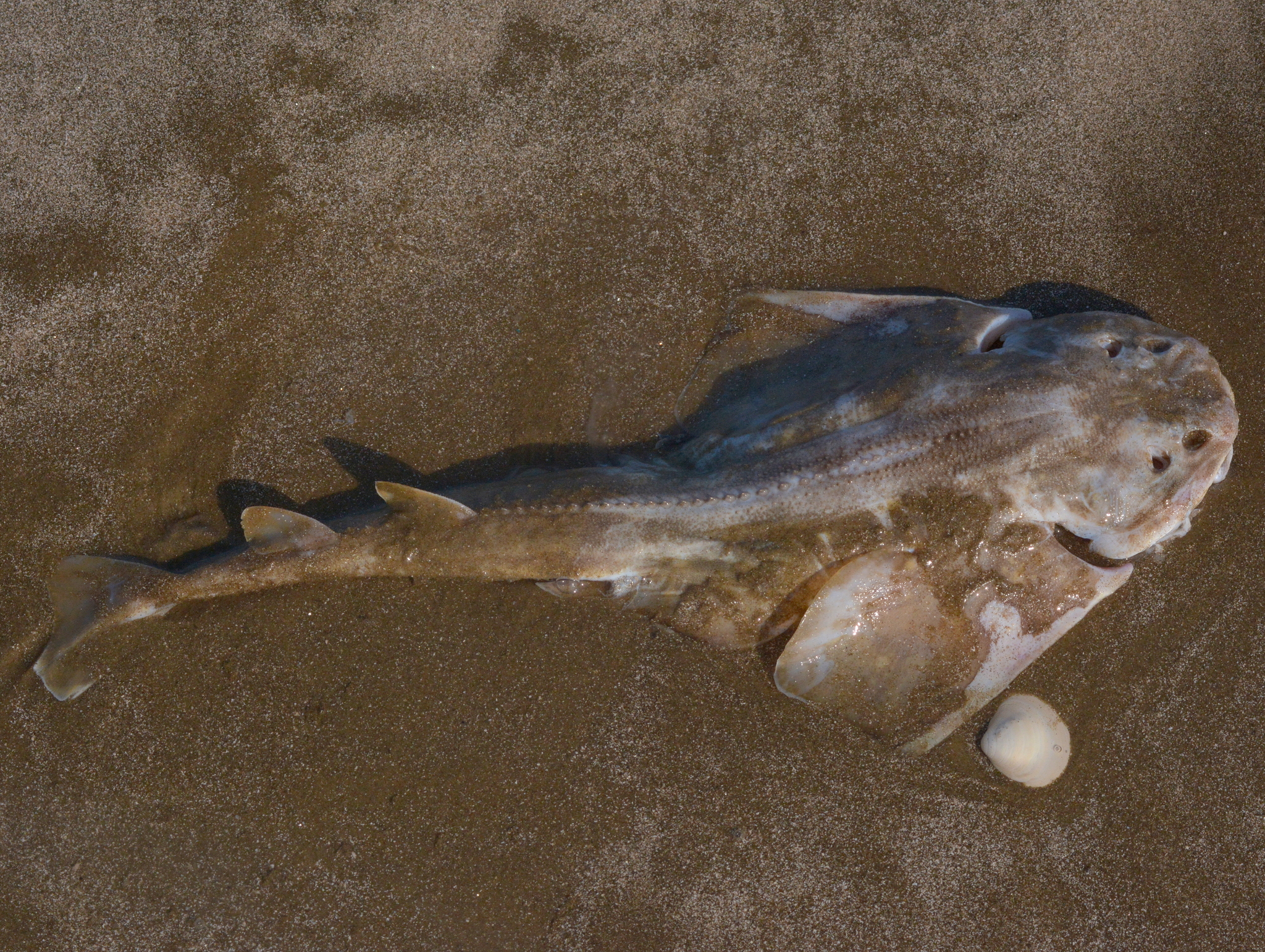

Conservation status
- Endangered (IUCN 3.1)

Scientific classification
- Kingdom: Animalia
- Phylum: Chordata
- Class: Chondrichthyes
- Subclass: Elasmobranchii
- Division: Selachii
- Order: Squatiniformes
- Family: Squatinidae
- Genus: Squatina
- Species: S. guggenheim

Binomial name
- Squatina guggenheim Marini, 1936
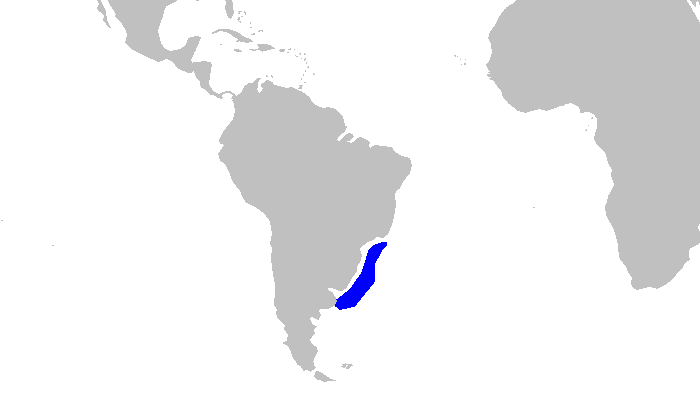
- Range of angular angelshark (in blue)

Synonyms
- Squatina punctata Marini, 1936

= Angular angelshark =

Species of shark

The angular angelshark (Squatina guggenheim) is a species of shark in the Squantinidae family. They are found in Brazil, Uruguay, and Argentina living in marine, brackish, and demersal environments at depths of 4-360 m. Their typical food sources consist of bony fish, crustaceans, and mollusks.

== Morphology ==
Squatina guggenheim is shaped like a ray and in males, a spiny surface is located on its pectoral fins. However, this spiny surface is absent in females and younglings. This spiny structure is thought to help males hold females while mating. Both males and females range from 89 to 130 cm in length. S. guggenheim have 18-22 teeth in the upper and lower jaw.

== Life cycle ==
Squatina guggenheim like some Chondrichthyes is ovoviviparous. The right ovary has been found to have few oocytes and is non-functional. Pregnancy lasts for 9-12 months and litters typically consist of 3-9 pups. Birth takes place in shallow waters.

== Distribution ==
Squatina guggenheim is found in the Southwestern Atlantic. They are abundant along the coast of Argentina, Uruguay and Brazil. This area is a subtropical zone and is at a latitude of 20°S - 45°S and a longitude of 68°W - 40°W. Typically, S. guggenheim are found in sandy or muddy areas of the ocean floor.

== Conservation ==
S. guggenheim is considered an endangered species by the IUCN red list due to overfishing and are more susceptible due to the fact they are bottom dwellers. In addition, it may be possible females leave their young earlier due to the stresses induced from fishing. Currently, Brazil has not taken any action in helping restore this species population.
