= Hidden angelshark =

Conservation status
- Critically Endangered (IUCN 3.1)

Scientific classification
- Kingdom: Animalia
- Phylum: Chordata
- Class: Chondrichthyes
- Subclass: Elasmobranchii
- Division: Selachii
- Order: Squatiniformes
- Family: Squatinidae
- Genus: Squatina
- Species: S. occulta

Binomial name
- Squatina occulta Vooren & K. G. da Silva, 1991

Species of shark

The hidden angelshark (Squatina occulta) is a species of angelshark that was named by Carolus Maria Vooren and Kleber Grübel da Silva in 1991. It inhabits the Atlantic coastline of South America from southern Brazil to Argentina. Hidden angelsharks grow up to 124 cm in length and are ovoviviparous, meaning the embryos develop inside eggs that remain inside the mother's body until they are ready to hatch.

== Size ==
This species reaches a length of 120 cm (47 in).

== Differences ==
The hidden angelshark differs from other species of angelshark due to the size of its neurocranial measurements. Its rostral region is considerably short compared to its counterparts. Its neurocranium is its widest at the outer corners of its nasal capsules and post-orbital processes. The hidden angelshark's configuration is very similar to that of a ray, the one major difference is the shark's gills, which lie edgewise of the head.

== Residence ==
Although there are many speculations as to where this species resides, studies show they are found in Puerto Quequén, Necochea, Buenos Aires Province, Argentina.
