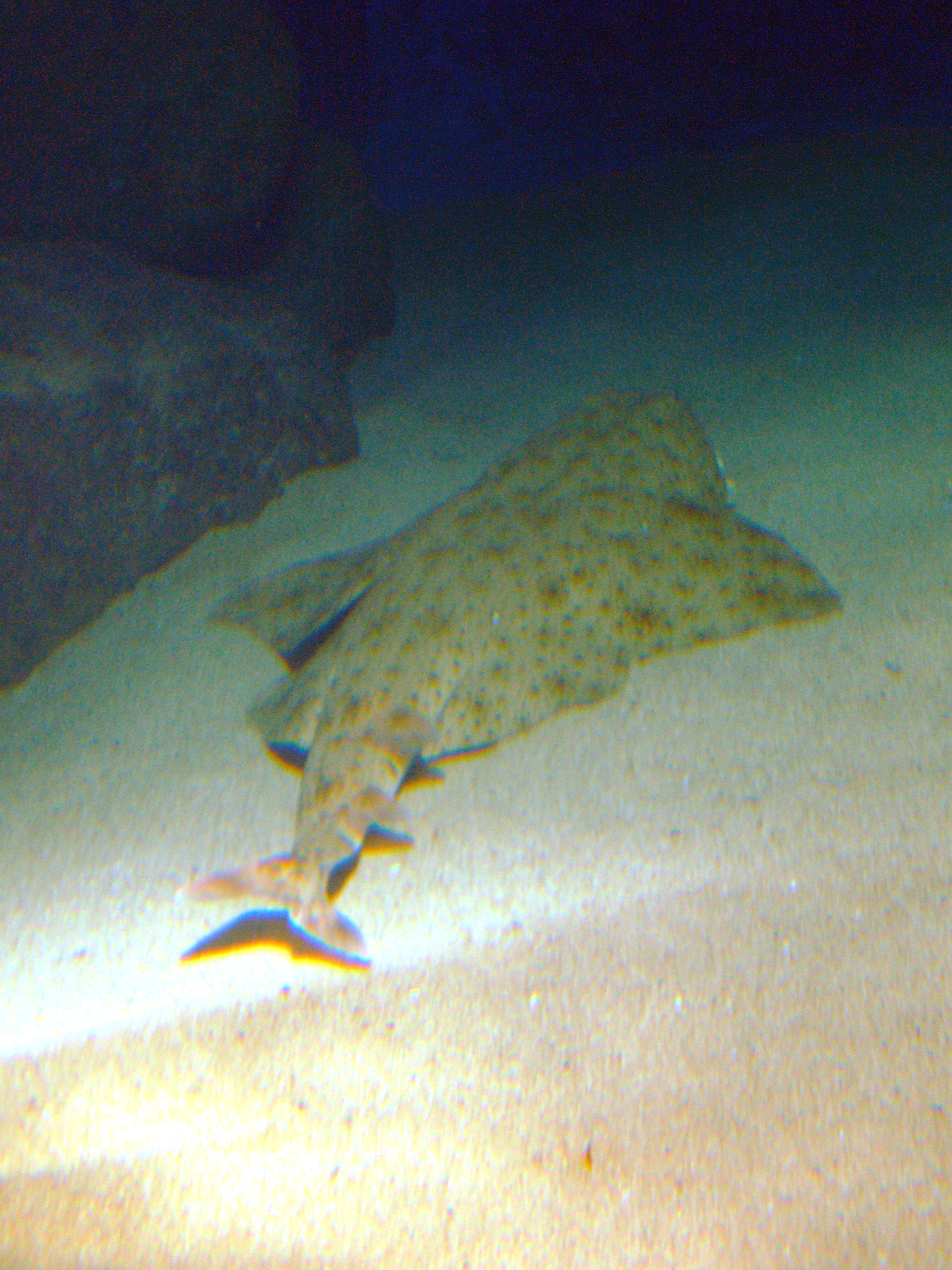

Conservation status
- Critically Endangered (IUCN 3.1)

Scientific classification
- Kingdom: Animalia
- Phylum: Chordata
- Class: Chondrichthyes
- Subclass: Elasmobranchii
- Division: Selachii
- Order: Squatiniformes
- Family: Squatinidae
- Genus: Squatina
- Species: S. aculeata

Binomial name
- Squatina aculeata Cuvier, 1829
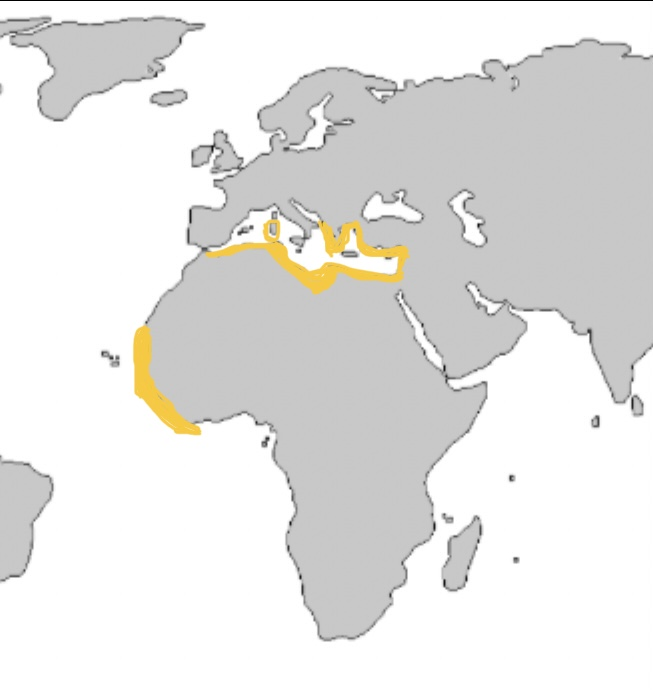
- Range of sawback angelshark (in gold)

= Sawback angelshark =

Species of shark

The sawback angelshark (Squatina aculeata) is an angelshark of the family Squatinidae It is one of rarest species of sharks known to date, and one of the three species of angelsharks that inhabits the Mediterranean. The Sawback angelshark lives in sandy and muddy bottoms of the ocean at depths of 30–500m.

== Measurements ==
Their size at birth ranges from 30 to 35 cm. As adults, female measurements range from 137 to 143 cm, while males range from 120 to 122 cm. Their relative weight based on the size of the shark for males is between 12.7 kg and 24.0 kg. In females, they weigh anywhere from 22 to 32 kg. The females grow to be larger than the males because they need to be able to carry and support their young.

== Development ==
The development of the males was measured in three stages, juvenile, subadult and adult. The juvenile males had short and flexible claspers and the testes were membranous and barely developed. The subadult males showed changes in the claspers involving slight calcification and elongation in the sharks. It is in the adult stage that the claspers are fully elongated and calcified, and are rigid. The spermatozoa had developed and sperm production became possible in these adult sharks.

The three development stages for females are the same for males: juvenile, subadult and adult. The juvenile females have whitish ovaries, and extremely small ovaries, which need to be seen under a microscope. In the subadult females, they have primarily white, translucent follicles, differentiated genital areas, and developed ovarian glands. In adult females, the fully functional ovaries exhibits developing and fully developed follicles.

== Appearance ==
Their eyes are larger than their spiracle. The frontal cephalic membranes are lobed; external nasal flap fringed; spiracle with 13–14 pseudo branchial lamellae. Has concave between eye, eye spiracle distance <1.5 x eye length. They have between 19 and 24 teeth, the average of the species being 21 total teeth. Their pectoral fin base at is least half of their fin length. They have denticles on their back which are large-based, almost pyramidal, with a line of median spines. The lower belly of the shark has denticles only on outer edges of pectoral and pelvic fins Obtains large thorns atop its head in a row down its back. The colour of the angelshark is light brown mottled with dark brown, with white sports arranged on the head and some of the body. Obtains dark blotches on head, back, the fin bases and tail. The species contains no ocelli.

== Distribution and range ==
The range of the sawback angelshark continues to decrease as their population declines. They range along the Eastern Atlantic in Senegal, Gambia, and Sierra Leone. They also inhabit the Southern Mediterranean coastline in Algeria to the eastern basin, and along the northern coast from Turkey possibly to Albania, although their presence is unknown further east. Its presence is unknown in Algeria, Sardinia, Malta, Libya, Egypt, Israel, Lebanon, Syria, southern Cyprus, Crete, and Western Mainland Greece.

== Climate and habitat ==
Subtropical; offshore species, outer continental shelf and upper slope, demersal, marine. Usually found on muddy bottoms. 30–500 m (98–1,640 ft) down.

== Behavior ==
As with other angelsharks, the sawback angelshark is a bottom-dweller that tries to camouflage at the bottom of the ocean in order to ambush and capture its prey.

== Feeding ==
Sawback angelsharks are ambush predators, meaning they lie on the ocean floor and wait for their prey to pass by. They feed on small sharks, bony fishes, cephalopods, and crustaceans.

== Reproduction ==
Sawback angelshark reproduction is ovoviviparous. This means the young develop inside the mother as eggs until they are ready to hatch. The average generation of the sawback angelshark is 15 years, so they have a low population doubling time. Females produce live young, and their litter size ranges from 8 to 12 pups. The female fecundity ranges from 12 to 22, and larger females sharks tend to have a higher fecundity and produce more offspring than smaller females.

== Status ==
IUCN Red List: Critically Endangered. Added to endangered species list in 2007 due to overexploitation. One major source of their decline has been contamination in the North-Eastern Mediterranean. Due to agricultural, industrial and urban wastes, the Mediterranean has seen an untick in the amount of toxic heavy metals. The metals most present are Iron (Fe), Zinc (Zn), and Mercury (Hg). These metals have been found in dangerous quantities in Angelsharks gills, liver and muscle tissues.

Another major contributing factor to the decline of the species has been fisheries and overfishing in the Mediterranean. This comes from illegal, unreported and unregulated (IUU) fishing, commercial fishing (lack of species identification, as well as the impact of different gear types), recreational fishing, subsidence/food security and small scale fishing. Human intrusion into the angel sharks environment has also caused a significant disruption to their habitat and breeding spaces. Lastly, residential and commercial development has added to the decline of the species including coastal building and infrastructure development, renewable energy sources like underwater turbines. Combined, these have led to the decline in population numbers causing a lack of genetic diversity in the species.

== Threat to Humans ==
The sawback angelshark is a harmless species, but may be dangerous to humans if provoked or their habitat is disturbed.
