= Taiwan angelshark =

Conservation status
- Endangered (IUCN 3.1)

Scientific classification
- Kingdom: Animalia
- Phylum: Chordata
- Class: Chondrichthyes
- Subclass: Elasmobranchii
- Division: Selachii
- Order: Squatiniformes
- Family: Squatinidae
- Genus: Squatina
- Species: S. formosa

Binomial name
- Squatina formosa Shen & Ting, 1972
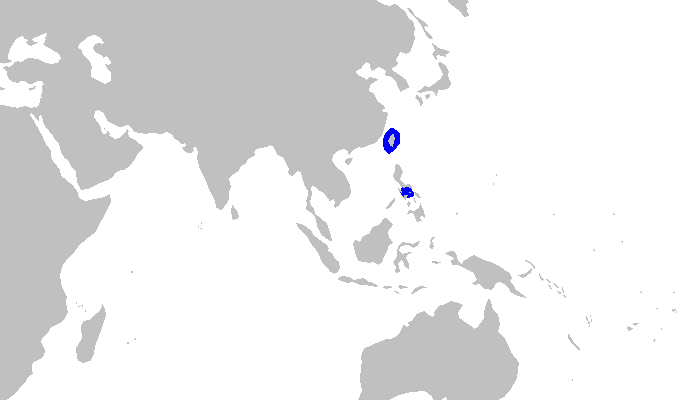
- Range of Taiwan angel shark (in blue)

Species of shark

The Taiwan angelshark (Squatina formosa) is an angelshark in the family Squatinidae. The Taiwan angelshark is one of four species of Squatina in the waters around Taiwan and Japan. It is a demersal, ray-like shark that grows to 1–2 meters in length.

== Taxonomy ==
The genus Squatina is the only genus in the monogeneric family Squatinidae. The Taiwan angelshark was described in 1972 and named after the historic name for Taiwan, "Formosa".

== Description ==
Taiwan angelsharks are ray-like sharks. Since they are demersal sharks and spend most of their time resting on the sediment, their eyes and spiracles are located dorsally. The dorsal surface is covered in somewhat rough dermal denticles. The overall shape of the head is rounded and about 20 percent of the total body length. The widest part of the head is just before the gill openings. The species has tubercles between the mouth and eyes. Its teeth are small and cone-like without serrations, forming three rows. Taiwan angel sharks have large, broad pectoral fins, spineless dorsal fins, no anal fins, and a caudal fin that is hypocercal (the lower lobe is larger and more pronounced than the upper lobe). Both dorsal fins are lobed and are approximately the same size. An adult Taiwan angel shark can grow to be up to 2 m in length. Growth is generally slow and maturity happens late in life. Reproduction is ovoviviparous.

Like other benthic sharks, is dark in coloration, brown with many black and white splotches on the dorsal side. The abdomen is lighter, pale white, with black splotches.

== Distribution and habitat ==
Taiwan angelsharks are endemic to the waters of the continental shelf off Taiwan, between latitudes 20° N and 24° N). They occur at depths of 100–300 m, sometimes in shallower waters. The species is an ambush predator and buries itself in the sediment to wait for prey to come into range.

== Conservation ==
The Taiwan angelshark is classified as Endangered by the IUCN, based on suspected population declines of 50-80% within its limited range. While it is not a target of fisheries, it is a frequent and generally retained bycatch of bottom trawling. Its entire range coincides with the extent of Taiwan's main fisheries (including longline and gillnetting). As the species is slow-maturing and has relatively few offspring, it is thought to be heavily impacted by this constant exploitation. No active conservation measures are currently in place.
