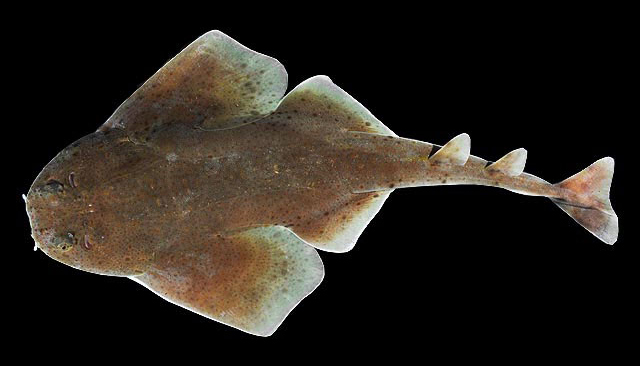
- Squatina dumeril
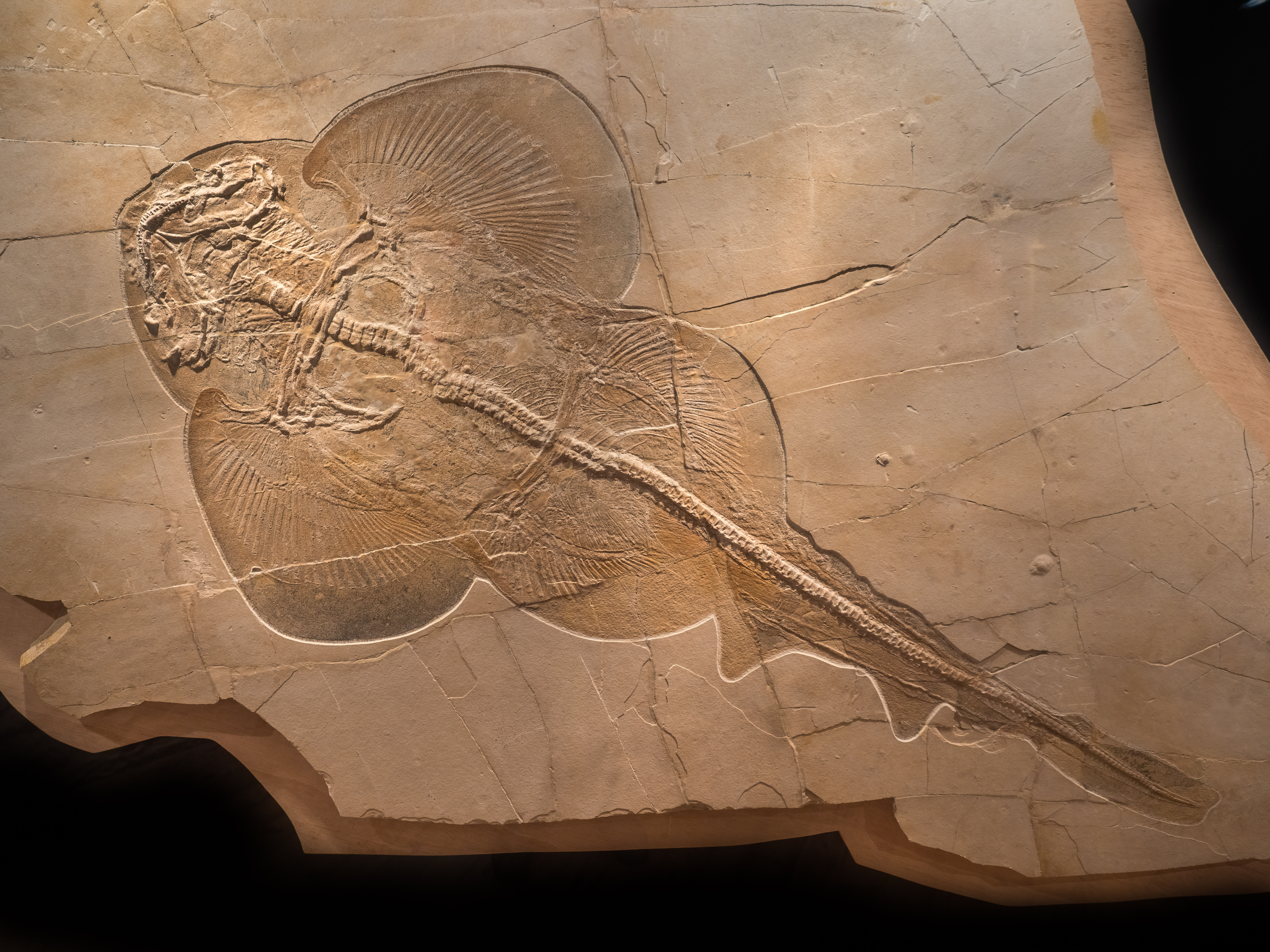
- Fossil of Pseudorhina from the Late Jurassic of Germany

Scientific classification
- Kingdom: Animalia
- Phylum: Chordata
- Class: Chondrichthyes
- Subclass: Elasmobranchii
- Division: Selachii
- Superorder: Squalomorphi
- Series: Squatinida
- Order: Squatiniformes; Compagno, 1973

Families
- †Pseudorhinidae Klug and Kriwet, 2012; †Pseudorhina; Squatinidae Bonaparte, 1838; †Cretasquatina; †Cretascyllium; †Parasquatina?; Squatina

= Squatiniformes =

Squatiniformes Temporal range: Late Jurassic–Recent

Order of sharks

Squatiniformes is an order of sharks belonging to Squalomorphi. It contains only a single living genus Squatina, commonly known as angelsharks. The oldest genus of the order, Pseudorhina is known from the Late Jurassic of Europe. Three other genera, Cretasquatina, Cretascyllium and Parasquatina are known from Cretaceous fossils from North America and Europe, though the placement of Parasquatina in the order has been questioned. All living and extinct members of the order share a similar body morphology with a highly flattened body with enlarged pectoral and pelvic fins suggestive of a bottom-dwelling ambush predator ecology. Teeth have been assigned to the modern genus from the Late Jurassic onwards, but the actual genus assignment of many of these species is unclear. The earliest records that can be assigned with confidence to the modern genus are known from the Early Cretaceous (Aptian) of England.
