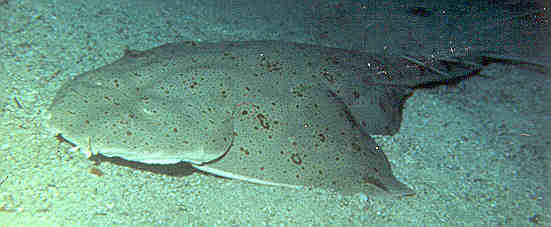

Conservation status
- Vulnerable (IUCN 3.1)

Scientific classification
- Kingdom: Animalia
- Phylum: Chordata
- Class: Chondrichthyes
- Subclass: Elasmobranchii
- Division: Selachii
- Order: Squatiniformes
- Family: Squatinidae
- Genus: Squatina
- Species: S. californica

Binomial name
- Squatina californica Ayres, 1859
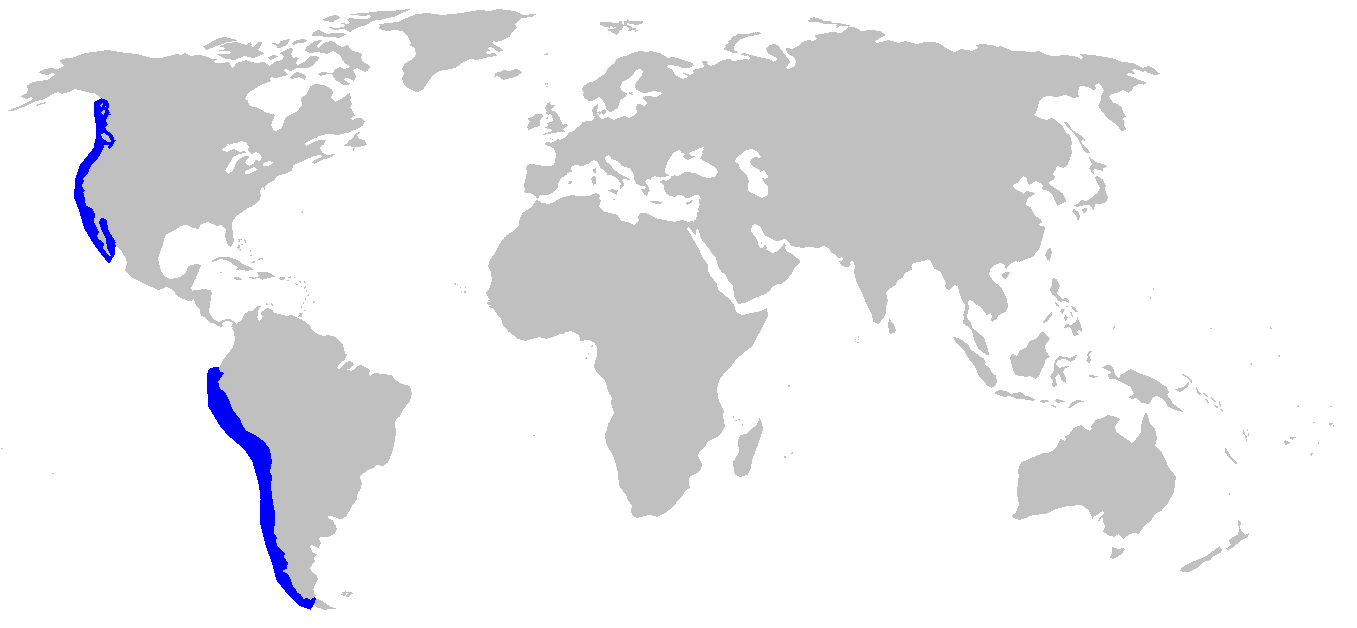
- Range of the Pacific angelshark

Synonyms
- Rhina philippi* Garman, 1913

= Pacific angelshark =

Species of shark

The Pacific angelshark (Squatina californica) is a species of angelshark, family Squatinidae, found in the eastern Pacific Ocean from Alaska to the Gulf of California, and from Ecuador to Chile, although those in the Gulf of California and southeastern Pacific may in fact be separate species. The Pacific angelshark inhabits shallow, coastal waters on sandy flats, usually near rocky reefs, kelp forests, or other underwater features. This species resembles other angel sharks in appearance, with a flattened body and greatly enlarged pectoral and pelvic fins. Characteristic features of this shark include a pair of cone-shaped barbels on its snout, angular pectoral fins, and a brown or gray dorsal coloration with many small dark markings. It attains a maximum length of 1.5 m (4.9 ft).

An ambush predator, the Pacific angelshark conceals itself on the sea floor and waits for approaching prey, primarily bony fishes and squid. Prey are targeted visually and, with a quick upward thrust of the head, snatched in protrusible jaws. Individual sharks actively choose ideal ambush sites, where they stay for several days before moving on to a new one. This species is more active at night than during the day, when it stays buried in sediment and seldom moves. Reproduction is ovoviviparous, with the embryos hatching inside the mother's uterus and being sustained by a yolk sac until birth. Females give birth to an average of six young every spring.

Pacific angelsharks are not dangerous to humans unless provoked, in which case their bite can cause a painful injury. They are valued for their meat and are captured by commercial and recreational fishers across their range. A targeted gillnet fishery for this species began off Santa Barbara, California in 1976 and ended in 1994, after overfishing and new regulations led to its near-collapse. This species is now mainly fished in Mexican waters. The International Union for Conservation of Nature (IUCN) has assessed this species as Near Threatened, as the Californian population is largely protected and recovering, while the impact of Mexican fisheries is unknown.

== Taxonomy and phylogeny ==
The Pacific angelshark was first scientifically described in 1859 by William Orville Ayres, the first Curator of Ichthyology at the California Academy of Sciences. He gave it the specific epithet californica, as the originally-described specimen was caught off San Francisco. Locally, this species may also be referred to as angel shark, California angel shark, or monkfish.

The Chilean angelshark (Squatina armata) of the southeastern Pacific was synonymized with this species by Kato, Springer and Wagner in 1967, but was later tentatively recognized as a separate species again by Leonard Compagno. The taxonomic status of angel sharks in the southeastern Pacific – whether they are S. californica, S. armata, or if there is more than one Squatina species in the region – remains unresolved. The angel sharks inhabiting the Gulf of California may also represent a different species, as they mature at a much smaller size than those from the rest of their range.

- - - - Squatina dumeril
      - Squatina californica
    - - Squatina occulta
      - Squatina guggenheim
  - Squatina armata

Phylogenetic relationships of the Pacific angelshark.

A phylogenetic study based on mitochondrial DNA, published by Björn Stelbrink and colleagues in 2010, reported that the sister species of the Pacific angelshark is the sand devil (S. dumeril) of the western North Atlantic. The two species are estimated to have diverged approximately 6.1 Ma, close to when the Isthmus of Panama first began to form. The authors also found that Pacific angelsharks from the Gulf of California differed genetically from those elsewhere, though they were equivocal as to whether this represented a species-level distinction.

== Distribution and habitat ==
Pacific angelsharks are found in cold to warm-temperate waters from the southeastern corner of Alaska to the Gulf of California, including the entire Baja peninsula, and are most common off central and southern California. It may also occur from Ecuador to the southern tip of Chile (see taxonomic uncertainty above). This bottom-dwelling shark prefers habitats with soft, flat bottoms close to shore, such as estuaries and bays, and are often found near rocky reefs, submarine canyons, and kelp forests. On occasion, they have been seen swimming 15–91 m (49–299 ft) above the sea floor. Off California, the Pacific angelshark is most common at a depth of 3–45 m (9.8–147.6 ft), but has been reported from as deep as 205 m (673 ft).

A number of genetically discrete subpopulations have been identified across the northern range of the Pacific angelshark. Several subpopulations exist along the coast from Point Conception northward to Alaska. In the Southern California Bight, there are at least three separate subpopulations off the mainland and northern and southern Channel Islands. The subpopulation along the Pacific coast of Baja California are distinct from those in the Gulf of California. These subpopulations have diverged from one another over time because Pacific angelsharks do not undertake long migratory movements outside of their preferred home areas, and deep waters serve as effective geographical barriers to population mixing. Heterozygosity, a measure of genetic diversity, is higher in the Pacific angelshark than in other shark species that have been examined.

== Description ==
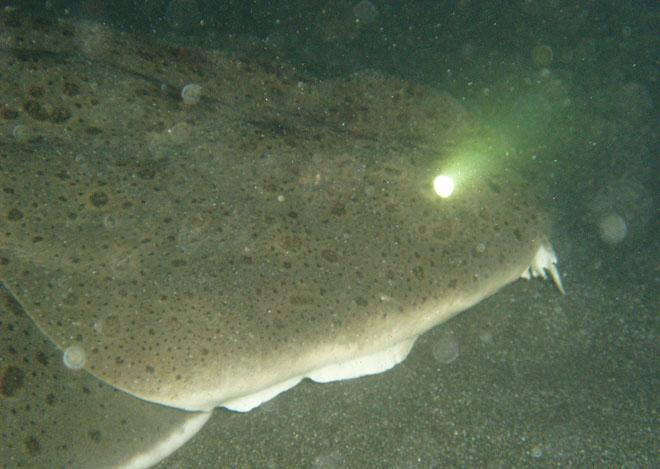
The Pacific angelshark has dorsally placed eyes, a terminal mouth, and nasal barbels.

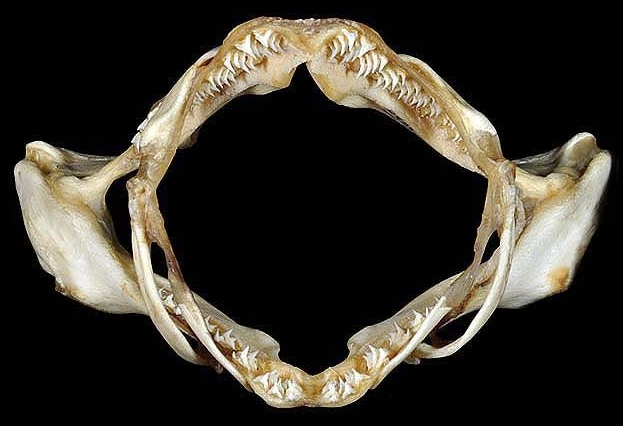
Squatina californica jaws

With its flattened body and wing-like pectoral fins, the Pacific angelshark superficially resembles a ray. Unlike in rays, its five pairs of gill slits are located on the sides of the head rather than underneath, and the expanded anterior lobes of its pectoral fins are separate rather than fused to the head. The eyes are located on top of the head, with the spiracles behind. There are folds of skin without triangular lobes on the sides of head. The mouth is very wide and placed terminally (at the front of the snout); a pair of cone-shaped barbels with spoon-like tips are located above. There are 9 tooth rows on either side of the upper jaw and 10 tooth rows on either side of the lower jaw, with toothless gaps at the middle of both jaws. Each tooth has a broad base and a single narrow, smooth-edged cusp. Pacific angelsharks are founded in Clover Point, Vancouver Island to southern Baja California and Gulf of California and Peru. Although, there are unverifiable records from southeastern Alaska and Chile. Common from Tomales Bay, northern California southward. Pacific angelsharks grow to be 175 cm (68.9 in) long, and at birth about 25 cm (9.8 in). Depth: surf zone to 205 m (672 ft).

The pectoral and pelvic fins are broad and angular with pointed tips. The two dorsal fins are located far back on the body, and there is no anal fin. The lower lobe of the caudal fin is larger than the upper. A row of small thorns runs down the middle of the back and tail; thorns are also present on the snout and over the eyes. As the shark ages, the thorns decrease in size and may disappear. The dorsal coloration is gray, brown, or reddish brown with scattered dark markings: large blotches surrounded by a ring of tiny spots in adults, and pairs of ocelli in juveniles. The underside is white, extending to the margins of the pectoral and pelvic fins. This species measures up to 1.5 m (59 in) long and weighs up to 27 kg (60 lb).

== Biology and ecology ==
During the day, Pacific angelsharks are almost never seen in the open, instead resting motionless on the sea floor buried under a thin layer of sediment that disguises their outlines. At night some individuals remain motionless, waiting for prey, while others may be encountered on the bottom unburied or actively swimming. Large sharks, including the great white shark (Carcharodon carcharias) and the broadnose sevengill shark (Notorynchus cepedianus), and the northern elephant seal (Mirounga angustirostris) are known to consume Pacific angelsharks. Known parasites of this species include the copepod Trebius latifurcatus, which infests the skin, the myxosporidian Chloromyxum levigatum, which infests the gall bladder, and the tapeworm Paraberrapex manifestus, which infests the spiral valve intestine. The leech Branchellion lobata may be attached around this shark's cloaca, inside the intestine, and even inside the uterus and on developing embryos.

=== Feeding ===
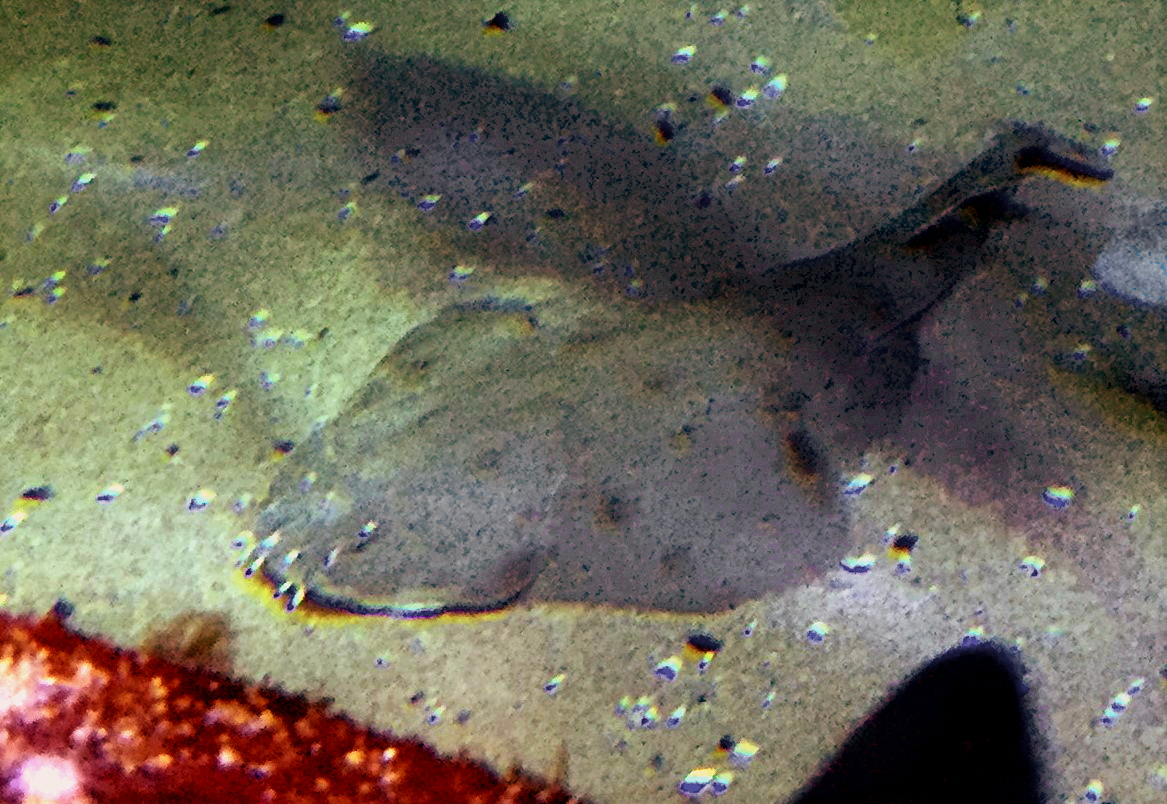
The Pacific angelshark's cryptic dorsal coloration enables it to ambush prey.

A sedentary ambush predator, the Pacific angelshark feeds mainly on bony fishes, including kelp bass, croakers, flatfishes, damselfishes, mackerels, and sardines. During the winter and early spring, spawning squid are abundant and become the primary source of food. In the southern Gulf of California, the most important prey species are, in descending order, the mackerel Decapterus macrosoma, the toadfish Porichthys analis, the lizardfish Synodus evermanni, the soldierfish Myripristis leiognathus, and the shrimp Sicyonia penicillata. At Catalina Island, this species feeds mainly on the blacksmith (Chromis punctipinnis) and the queenfish (Seriphus politus). Adults and juveniles have similar diets.

Individual sharks choose sites giving them the best ambush success. They prefer junctions of sandy and rocky substrates near reefs (used by many fishes for shelter) usually orienting themselves either toward or parallel to nearby vertical structures. They tend to face upslope, which may facilitate burying via falling sediment, bring more fish swimming downstream from the reef, or ease targeting by silhouetting prey against the sunlight.

Once settled at a successful site, an angelshark may remain there for ten days, re-burying itself on or near the same spot after every strike. As the local prey eventually learn to avoid the stationary predator, the shark periodically shifts at night to a new site several kilometers away. One study off Santa Catalina Island found that over 13–25 hours, nine sharks together used only 1.5 km^{2} (0.6 mi^{2}). A later, longer-term study found that the sharks' sporadic position changes covered as much as 75 km (47 mi) over three months, almost circling the island. Single individuals swam up to 7.3 km (4.5 mi) in a night.

The Pacific angelshark is primarily a visual hunter; experiments in nature show that they strike at fish-shaped targets without any electrical, chemical, vibrational, or behavioral cues. At night, they are guided by the bioluminescence of planktonic dinoflagellates and ostracods disturbed by moving prey. This species' visual system is attuned to the wavelengths of light emitted by these planktonic organisms, showing the importance of night hunting. Pacific angelsharks are more likely to strike at prey approaching from the front. It usually waits until the prey approaches to 15 cm (5.9 in), as its attack is less accurate beyond this distance. The strike is a stereotyped behavior in which the shark presses the forward lobes of its pectoral fins against the bottom and thrusts its head upwards at up to a 90° angle. Its mouth forms a tube when opened, creating a suction force, while its jaws protrude forward to secure the prey between sharp teeth. During the strike, the eyes roll backward into the head for protection. The strike is often completed in under a tenth of a second.

=== Life cycle ===
The Pacific angelshark is aplacental viviparous with the unborn young nourished by a yolk sac; reproduction occurs on an annual cycle. Most females have a single functional ovary (on the left side), though some have two; the oviducts are often filled with yolk, which is speculated to be from the resorption of unfertilized eggs. At 35 mm (1.4 in) long, the young embryos have translucent skin, protruding eyes, and exposed gill filaments. Spots of pigment have developed when the embryo is 70 mm (2.8 in) long, and the first row of teeth has appeared when the embryo is 110 mm (4.3 in) long. By the time the embryo is 150 mm (5.9 in) long, the mouth has migrated to a terminal position and the color pattern has fully developed; the external yolk sac begins to shrink as the yolk is transferred to an internal yolk sac, where it is held until it can be transferred to the intestine for digestion. The internal yolk sac is fully resorbed before birth; if the pup is released prematurely, it does not feed until this process is complete.

Off Santa Barbara, birthing takes place from March to June after a gestation period of ten months, and the females mate again shortly afterward. The average litter size is six, with a range of 1–11 (rarely 13); there is no correlation between female size and number of offspring. The young are born in water 55–90 m (180–295 ft) deep, probably to protect them from predators. Pacific angelshark embryos grow at 45 mm (1.8 in) per month when young, slowing down to 10 mm (0.39 in) per month just before birth, and are born at a length of 25–26 cm (9.8–10.2 in). Newborn pups in captivity grow at a rate of around 14 cm (5.5 in) per year, while adults in the wild grow at around 2 cm (0.79 in) per year. Both sexes mature at 90–100 cm (3.0–3.3 ft) long, corresponding to an age of 8–13 years. Gulf of California sharks, which may be another species, mature at 78 cm (2.56 ft) long for males and 85 cm (2.79 ft) long for females. About 20% of newborns survive to maturity. The maximum lifespan has been estimated at 25–35 years. Unlike other sharks, the growth rings on the vertebrae of this species are deposited in proportion to the shark's size rather than yearly, making age determination difficult.

== Human interactions ==
Although usually sedate and approachable underwater, Pacific angelsharks are quick to bite if touched, captured, or otherwise provoked, and can inflict severe lacerations. Commercial fisheries for this species exist off Baja California and to a lesser extent off California (see below); the meat is considered excellent and is sold fresh or frozen. This species is captured in limited numbers by recreational fishers using hook-and-line, spears, or even by hand, particularly off southern California. It is also taken as bycatch in shrimp trawls operating in the Gulf of California, and processed into fishmeal. The capacity of this species to withstand a focused fishing effort is limited, due to its low rates of reproduction and movement.

In 1976, the commercial gillnet fishery for the California halibut (Paralichthys californicus), operating off Santa Barbara, expanded to include the Pacific angelshark as well. The sharks had become valuable due to their promotion as a substitute for the seasonally available common thresher shark (Alopias vulpinus), and the development of new processing techniques. Around 50% of the shark was used, while the skin, cartilage, and offal were discarded. In the 1980s, rising demand led to the introduction of gillnets with a medium-sized mesh, designed specifically for this species. Fishery landings increased from a dressed (post-processing) weight of 148 kg (326 lb) in 1977, to 117,000 kg (258,000 lb) in 1983, to 277,000 kg (611,000 lb) in 1984. The fishery peaked in 1985 and 1986, when 550,000 kg (1.2 million lbs) were taken annually, making this species the number one shark fished off California. This level of exploitation was unsustainable, and despite a minimum size limit imposed in 1986, catches fell to 112,000 kg (247,000 lb) in 1990.

In 1991, the use of gillnets in nearshore Californian waters was banned by a voter initiative (Proposition 132); the restricted area included much of the Pacific angelshark's habitat and reduced fishing pressure on the species. As a result, Pacific angelshark landings dropped further to 10,000 kg (22,000 lb) dressed in 1994, when the central Californian halibut/angel shark fishery was closed completely, and have remained low since. The decline of the Californian fishery led to the industry shifting to Mexico, where gillnet pangas (artisanal fishing vessels) targeting this species now meet most of the angel shark demand in California. The International Union for Conservation of Nature (IUCN) has assessed this species as Near Threatened; Pacific angelshark numbers off California appear to be increasing and demographic modeling suggests the stock is healthy. However, the impact of the intense, unregulated Mexican fishery on the global population is yet undetermined. There is continuing interest in California for a resumption of the commercial fishery, though conservation concerns have thus far taken precedence.
