= Myripristis earlei =

Conservation status
- Least Concern (IUCN 3.1)

Scientific classification
- Domain: Eukaryota
- Kingdom: Animalia
- Phylum: Chordata
- Class: Actinopterygii
- Order: Beryciformes
- Family: Holocentridae
- Genus: Myripristis
- Species: M. earlei

Binomial name
- Myripristis earlei (J. E. Randall, G. R. Allen & D. R. Robertson, 2003)

Species of fish

Myripristis earlei, or Earle's soldierfish, is a species of soldierfish belonging to the genus Myripristis. It is found in the East Central Pacific Ocean in the Phoenix and Marquesas Islands. It was previously regarded as an insular variant of Myripristis berndti. It is named after ichthyologist John L. Earle, who was the first to suspect that this was a separate species from M. berndti. It can be found in caves and under ledges, and feeds on zooplankton.
