= Myripristis trachyacron =

Conservation status
- Least Concern (IUCN 3.1)

Scientific classification
- Domain: Eukaryota
- Kingdom: Animalia
- Phylum: Chordata
- Class: Actinopterygii
- Order: Beryciformes
- Family: Holocentridae
- Genus: Myripristis
- Species: M. trachyacron

Binomial name
- Myripristis trachyacron (Bleeker, 1863)

Species of fish

Myripristis trachyacron, the East Indian soldierfish, is a small, rare, poorly-understood species of soldierfish belonging to the genus Myripristis. It can be found in the Western Pacific Ocean in Indonesia, Philippines, Papua New Guinea and the Solomon Islands. It swims in small aggregations in current prone channels, at moderate slopes. It inhabits outer reef slopes. This species is easily mistaken for Myripristis vittata.
