= Myripristis aulacodes =

Scientific classification
- Kingdom: Animalia
- Phylum: Chordata
- Class: Actinopterygii
- Order: Beryciformes
- Family: Holocentridae
- Genus: Myripristis
- Species: M. aulacodes

Binomial name
- Myripristis aulacodes (J. E. Randall & D. W. Greenfield, 1996)

Species of fish

Myripistis aulacodes, the furrowed soldierfish, is a species of soldierfish from the genus Myripristis. It is endemic to Indonesia in the Western Pacific Ocean.
