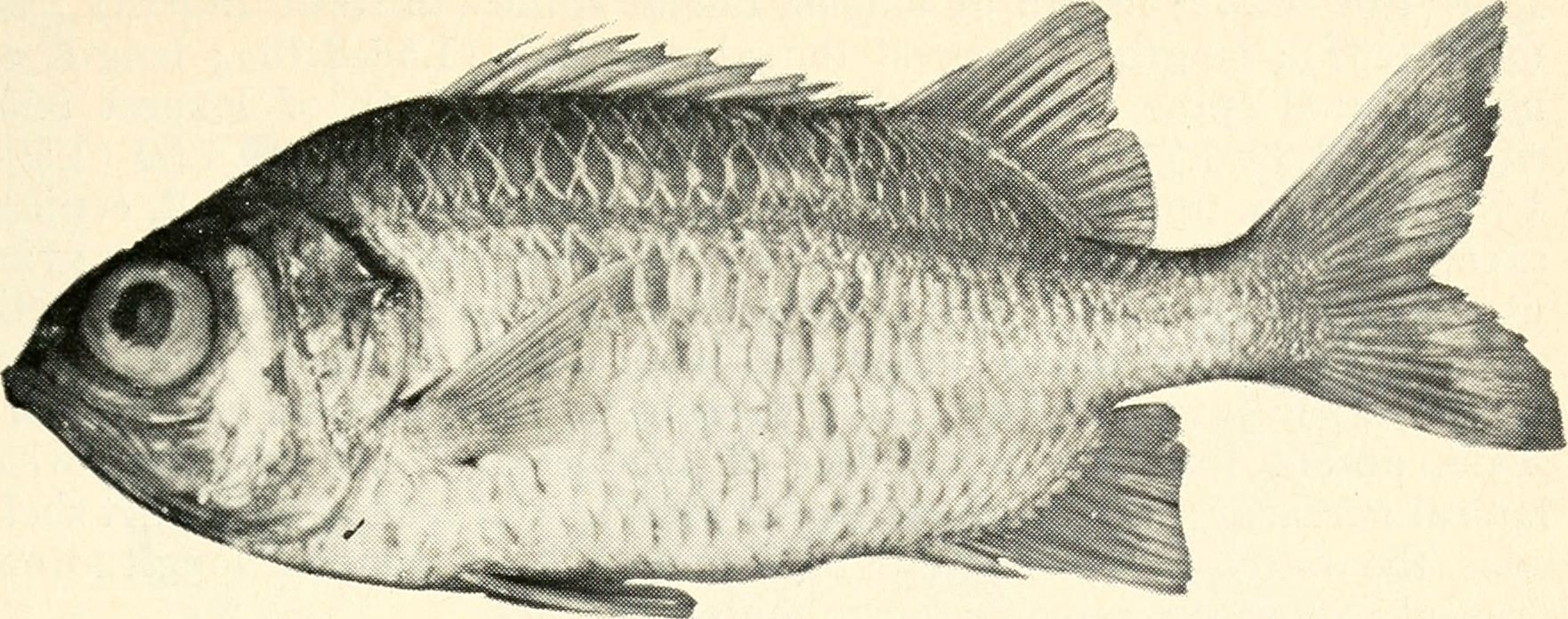

Conservation status
- Vulnerable (IUCN 3.1)

Scientific classification
- Kingdom: Animalia
- Phylum: Chordata
- Class: Actinopterygii
- Order: Beryciformes
- Family: Holocentridae
- Genus: Myripristis
- Species: M. gildi

Binomial name
- Myripristis gildi (D. W. Greenfield, 1965)

= Myripristis gildi =

Species of fish

Myripristis gildi, also known as the Clipperton cardinal soldierfish, is a species of soldierfish belonging to the genus Myripristis. First described in 1965 by Greenfield, it is endemic to Clipperton Island in the Eastern Pacific Ocean. Its total length reaches at least 21.4cm.
