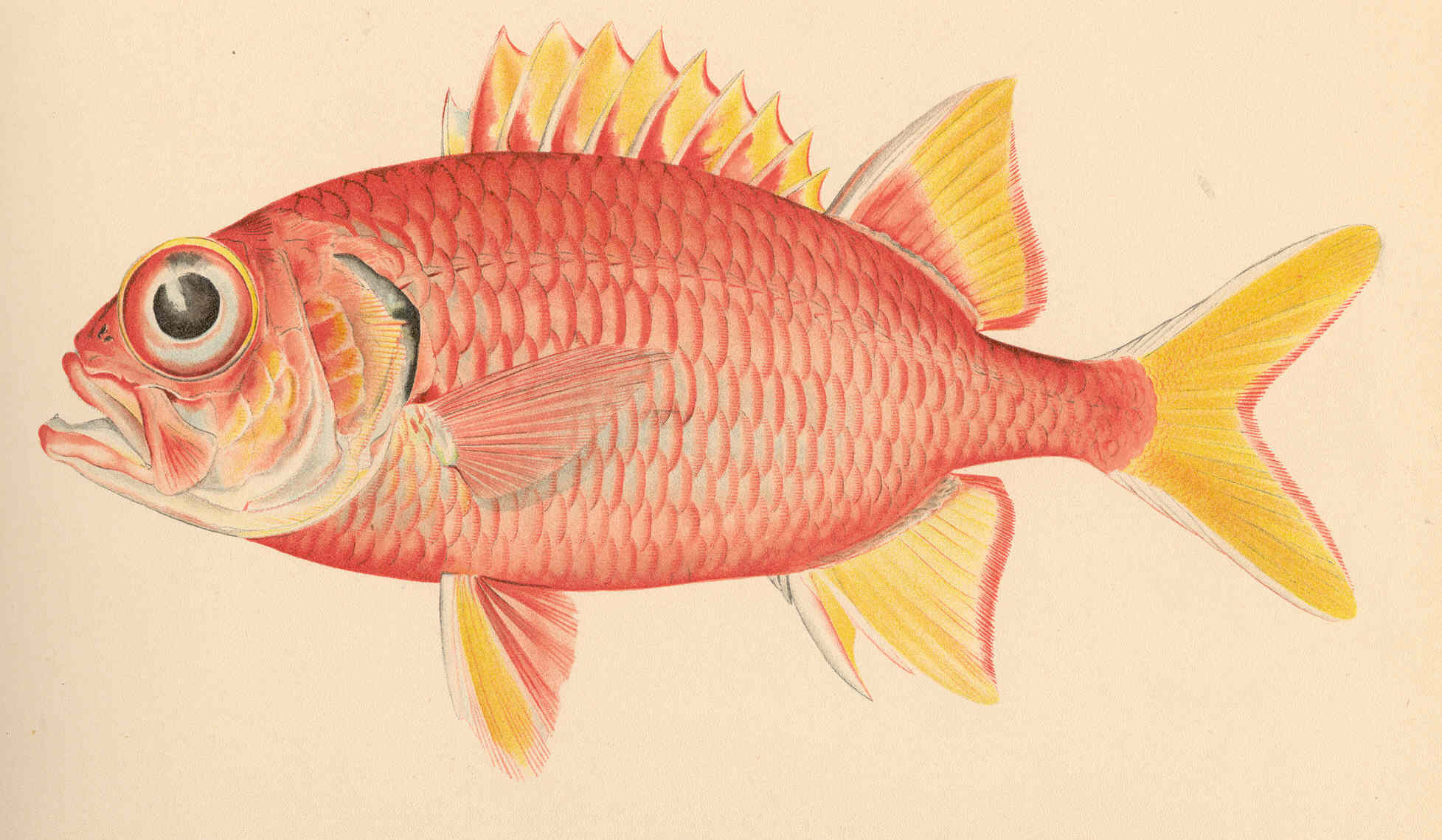

Conservation status
- Least Concern (IUCN 3.1)

Scientific classification
- Kingdom: Animalia
- Phylum: Chordata
- Class: Actinopterygii
- Order: Beryciformes
- Family: Holocentridae
- Genus: Myripristis
- Species: M. chryseres

Binomial name
- Myripristis chryseres (D. S. Jordan & Evermann, 1903)

= Myripristis chryseres =

Species of fish

Myripristis chryseres, the yellowfin soldierfish, is a nocturnal species of soldierfish from the genus Myripristis. In the Hawaiian language, it is also referred to as the ʻŪʻū. It has solid yellow fins, comparative to similar soldierfish species. It can be found in the tropical waters of the Indo-Pacific region. It feeds on zooplankton and can be seen either solitary or in groups. If non-solitary, group size usually varies from 2-3.

== Description ==
Myripristis chryseres have a bright red body and yellow fins. Their scales are large and their bodies are spiny, with large eyes help them with their nocturnal activity. They are distinguishable from other soldierfish by their black operculum. They usually range from 5–9 in (130–230 mm) long, but can reach 10 in (250 mm). Their main food source is large Zooplankton.

== Distribution and habitat ==
While vast and patchy, the range of distribution of the Myripristis chryseres frequents 3° to 28°N, and 5° to 31° S. It is found in the Indo-Pacific region, from Natal, South Africa to Samoa, Hawaii and the Tuamotu Islands, north to south Japan and the Ogasawara Islands, and south to Queensland, Australia

They can sometimes be observed in shallow water, but are predominantly deep-sea fish. It inhabits steep outer reef slopes and is often seen with Coelacanths at Ngazidja Island. Myripristis chryseres specifically inhabit deep inshore coral reefs, from depths 12–350 m (39–1,148 ft) deep.

Myripristis chryseres live under steep, rocky, and cavernous cliffs. They hide in their caves during the day, and depart at night to forage.

== Cultural significance ==
In Hawaiian culture, Myripristis chryseres is used as food, usually caught at night using spears, nets, or line. Due to the difficulty of skinning the fish, it is more commonly broiled; if served raw, the fish is cleaned of its organs, dorsal & anal fins.
