= Africentrum =

Africentrum Temporal range: Late Oligocene to Upper Miocene

Scientific classification
- Kingdom: Animalia
- Phylum: Chordata
- Class: Actinopterygii
- Division: Teleostei
- Order: Beryciformes
- Family: Holocentridae
- Subfamily: Myripristinae
- Genus: †Africentrum; White and Moy-Thomas, 1941
- Species: †A. melitense

Binomial name
- †Africentrum melitense (Woodward, 1887)

Synonyms
- Holocentrum melitense Woodward, 1887

Extinct genus of fishes

Africentrum is an extinct genus of prehistoric soldierfish that lived during the Late Oligocene to Late Miocene of Europe. It contains a single species, A. melitense, known from the Upper Miocene subepoch of what is now Malta. In addition, indeterminate fossil remains of this genus are known from the Late Oligocene of Poland.

It has been either recovered as the sister genus to Myripristis or in a polytomy with all the other genera in the subfamily.

== See also ==
- Prehistoric fish
- List of prehistoric bony fish
