= Myripristis formosa =

Conservation status
- Data Deficient (IUCN 3.1)

Scientific classification
- Kingdom: Animalia
- Phylum: Chordata
- Class: Actinopterygii
- Order: Beryciformes
- Family: Holocentridae
- Genus: Myripristis
- Species: M. formosa

Binomial name
- Myripristis formosa (J. E. Randall & D. W. Greenfield, 1996)

Species of fish

Myripristis formosa is a species of soldierfish belonging to the genus Myripristis. It is endemic to Taiwan in the North-west Pacific Ocean. It is named after the Republic of Formosa, a short-lived republic that existed on Taiwan. It is demersal with a depth range of 15m to 30m.
