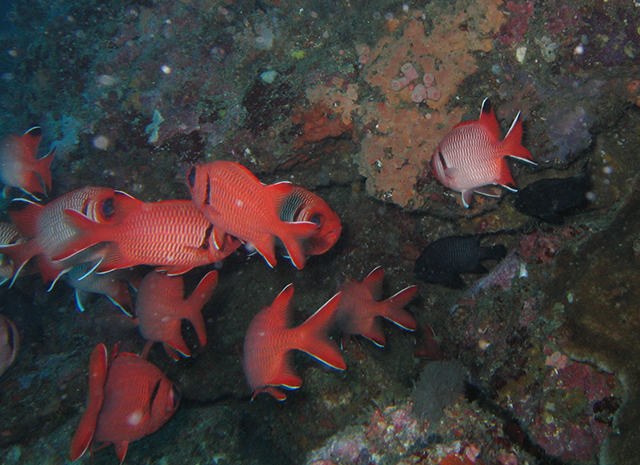

Scientific classification
- Kingdom: Animalia
- Phylum: Chordata
- Class: Actinopterygii
- Order: Beryciformes
- Family: Holocentridae
- Genus: Myripristis
- Species: M. robusta

Binomial name
- Myripristis robusta (J. E. Randall & D. W. Greenfield, 1996)

= Myripristis robusta =

Species of fish

Myripristis robusta, the robust soldierfish, is a species of soldierfish belonging to the genus Myripristis. It can be found in the Western Central Pacific Ocean in Luzon, Philippines and Madang Province, Papua New Guinea. It is named for its robust body. It can be found in protected waters with silty sand and rubble bottoms.
