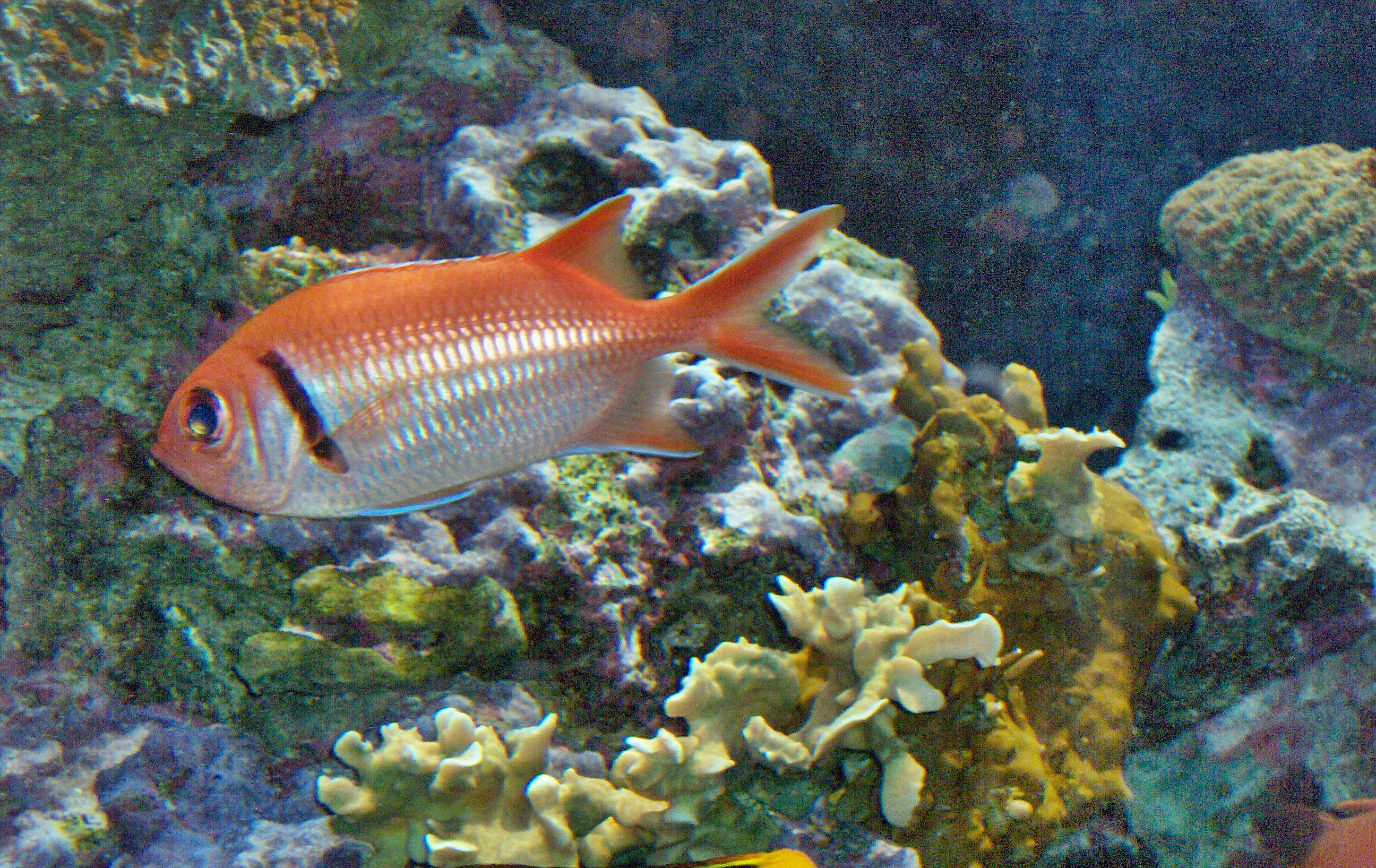

Conservation status
- Least Concern (IUCN 3.1)

Scientific classification
- Kingdom: Animalia
- Phylum: Chordata
- Class: Actinopterygii
- Order: Beryciformes
- Family: Holocentridae
- Genus: Myripristis
- Species: M. jacobus

Binomial name
- Myripristis jacobus G. Cuvier, 1829

= Myripristis jacobus =

Species of fish

Myripristis jacobus, the blackbar soldierfish, is a soldierfish from the Western Atlantic. It occasionally makes its way into the aquarium trade. It grows to a size of 25 cm in length.

Myripristis jacobus can be located in a marine environment within a subtropical climate. They live in reef-associated waters. Myripitis jacobus is recorded to be found in the Western Atlantic, Bahamas, Northern Gulf of Mexico, West Indies, the Caribbean Sea, Cape Verde, Principe, Ascension, and St. Helena islands. The biology of this species states that they can be found in coral reefs within deep waters. They are a nocturnal species. They mainly eat plankton and shrimps. This species is occasionally marketed, but it is not popularly bought as a fish to eat. It is a bright red color along with a black bar behind its head. It also is trimmed with white lines on its fins. This species is also found swimming upside-down at times.

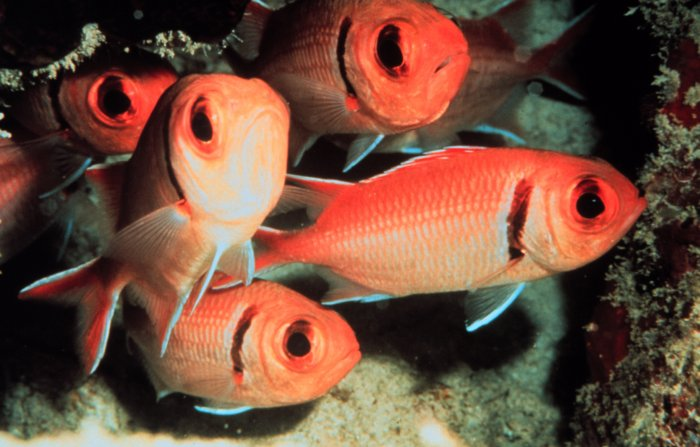
Blackbar soldierfish
