= Myripristis randalli =

Conservation status
- Least Concern (IUCN 3.1)

Scientific classification
- Kingdom: Animalia
- Phylum: Chordata
- Class: Actinopterygii
- Order: Beryciformes
- Family: Holocentridae
- Genus: Myripristis
- Species: M. randalli

Binomial name
- Myripristis randalli (D. W. Greenfield, 1974)

Species of fish

Myripristis randalli is a species of soldierfish belonging to the genus Myripristis. It can be found in the Eastern Central Pacific Ocean in Tonga, American Samoa, Pitcairn and the Austral Islands, and also in Taiwan. It is named after ichthyologist John Ernest Randall.
