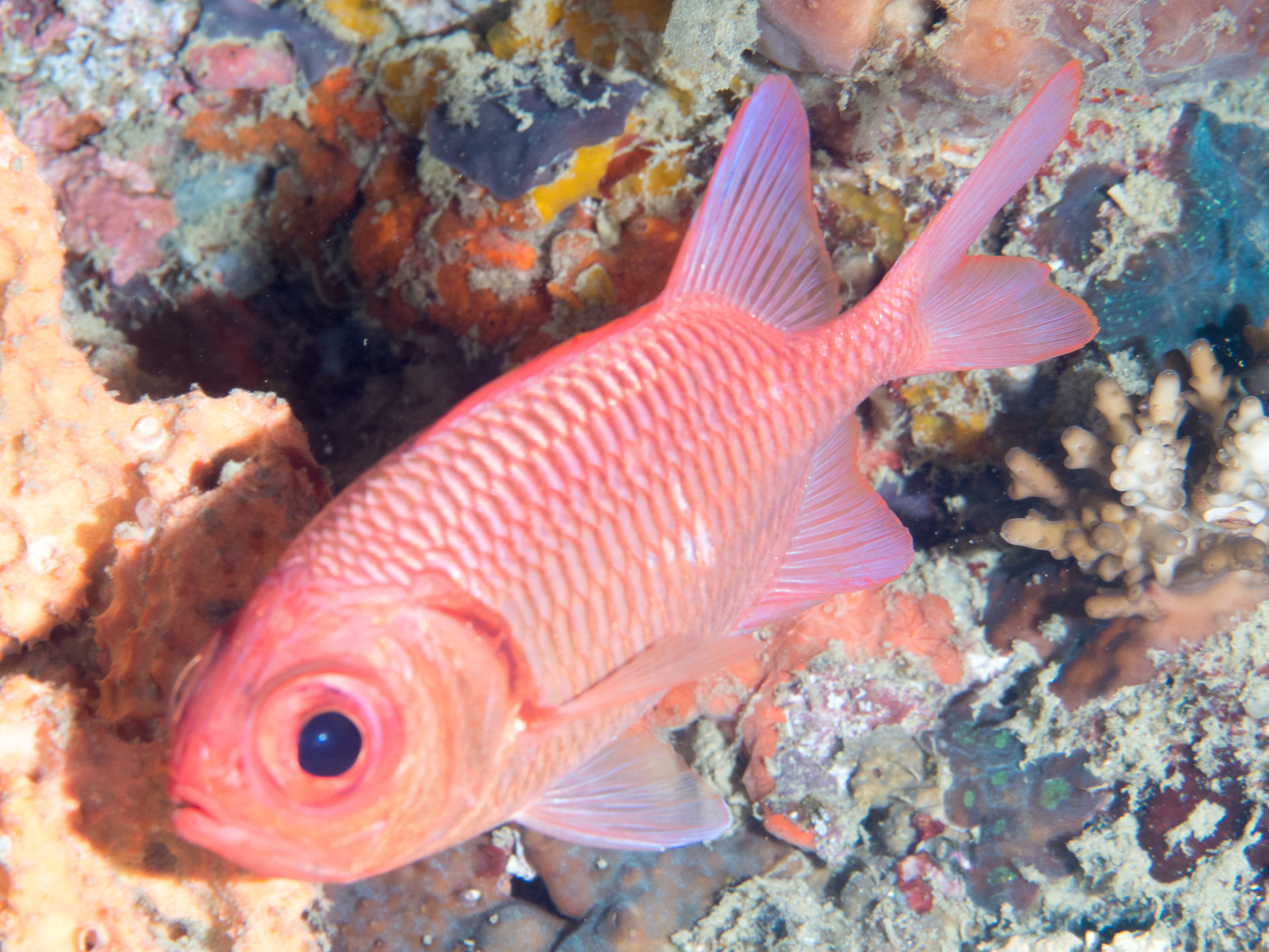

Conservation status
- Least Concern (IUCN 3.1)

Scientific classification
- Kingdom: Animalia
- Phylum: Chordata
- Class: Actinopterygii
- Order: Beryciformes
- Family: Holocentridae
- Genus: Myripristis
- Species: M. hexagona

Binomial name
- Myripristis hexagona (Lacépède, 1802)

Synonyms
- Lutjanus hexagonus Lacépède, 1802; Myripistis macrolepis Bleeker, 1872; Ostichthys spinicpes J. D. Ogilby, 1908

= Myripristis hexagona =

Species of fish

Myripristis hexagona, the doubletooth soldierfish, is a nocturnal species of soldierfish from the genus Myripristis. It is light red to yellowish in colour, and grows to a maximum length of 30 cm (11.8 in). It can be found in the Indo-Pacific region, from East Africa to Samoa, north to the Ryukyu Islands, Japan, and south to the Great Barrier Reef and New Caledonia. However, it has not been found on low islands or atolls in the Indo-Pacific region. It is found at depths of 3–40 metres (9.8–131.2 ft) and inhabits sheltered coastal and offshore reefs, typically in turbid areas of bays or lagoons. During the day, it hides in caves or beneath ledges, while at night, it feeds on plankton. It can be found in loose aggregations, sometimes with other species of soldierfish.
