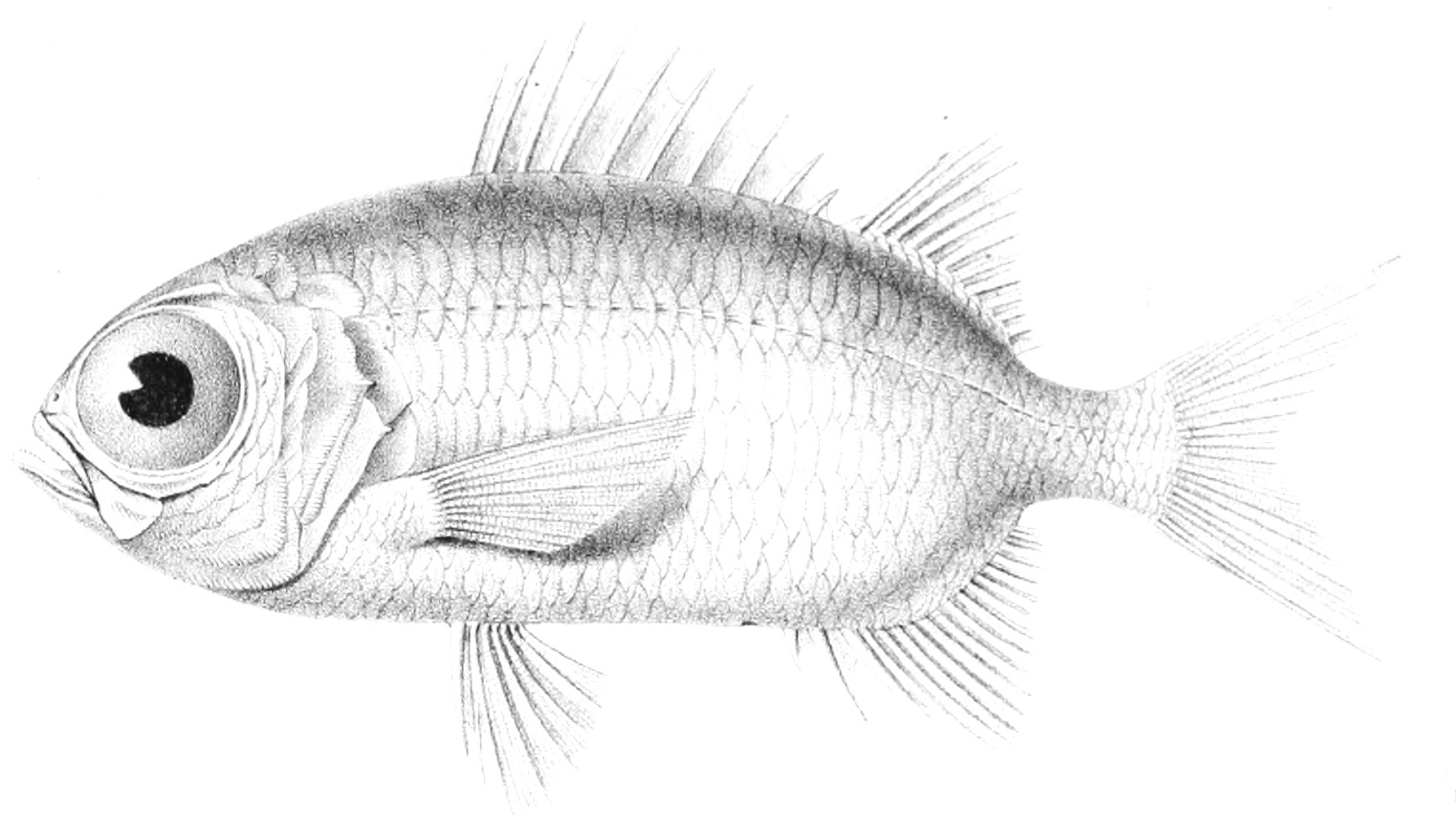

Conservation status
- Least Concern (IUCN 3.1)

Scientific classification
- Domain: Eukaryota
- Kingdom: Animalia
- Phylum: Chordata
- Class: Actinopterygii
- Order: Beryciformes
- Family: Holocentridae
- Genus: Myripristis
- Species: M. seychellensis

Binomial name
- Myripristis seychellensis (Cuvier, 1829)

= Myripristis seychellensis =

Species of fish

Myripristis seychellensis, the shy soldier, is a species of soldierfish belonging to the genus Myripristis. It can be found in the Western Indian Ocean in Madagascar, Réunion, the St. Brandon Shoals and Seychelles, which it is named after. It can also possibly be found in Taiwan It can be found hiding in caves.
