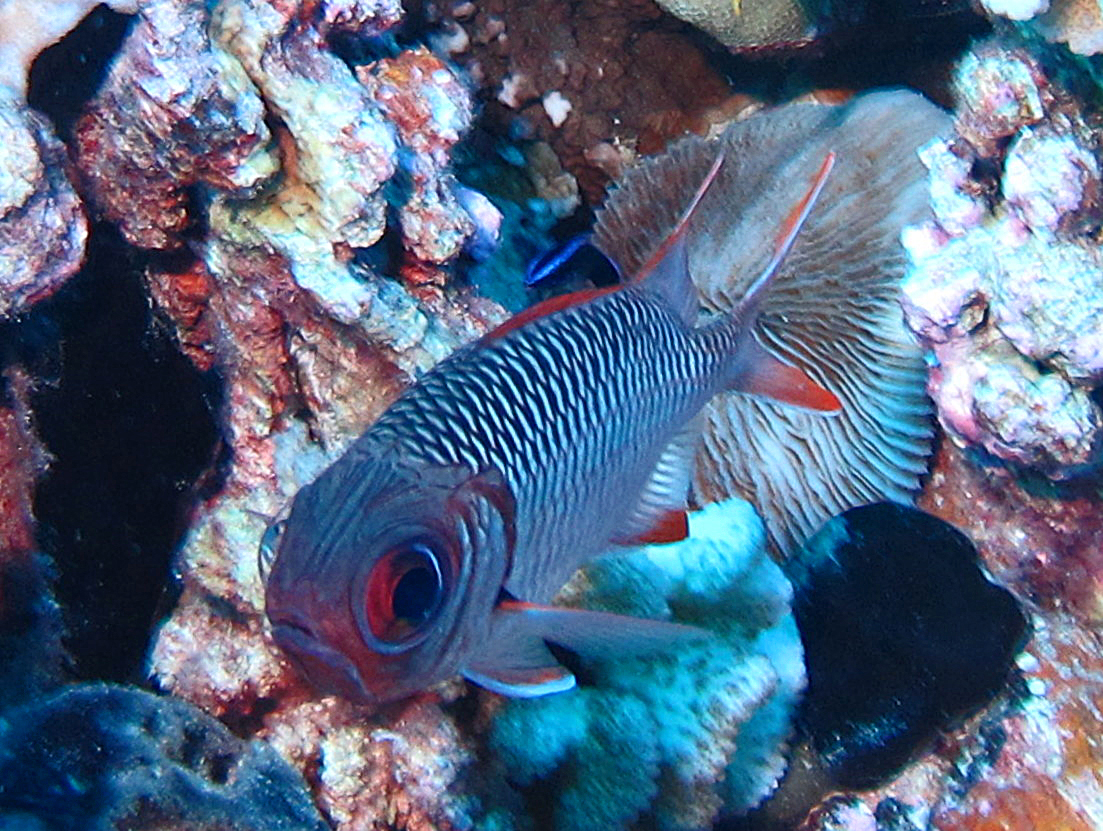
- Myripristis botche from French Polynesia

Conservation status
- Least Concern (IUCN 3.1)

Scientific classification
- Kingdom: Animalia
- Phylum: Chordata
- Class: Actinopterygii
- Order: Beryciformes
- Family: Holocentridae
- Genus: Myripristis
- Species: M. botche

Binomial name
- Myripristis botche G. Cuvier, 1829

= Myripristis botche =

Species of fish

Myripristis botche, the blacktip soldierfish, splendid soldierfish, or splendid squirrelfish, is a species of soldierfish belonging to the family Holocentridae.

== Description ==
Myripristis botche can reach a length of about 30 centimetres (12 in) TL. These fishes have 11 dorsal spines and 4 anal spines. The front of head is red, while the postorbital head and the body is silvery white, with red edges of scales. Soft dorsal, anal and caudal fin show white margins and black tips. Paired fins are white.

This species can be found in the aquarium trade.

== Behavior ==
This fish likes to hide in caves or crevices during the day. It is usually seen in pairs, and occasionally in schools in some oceanic locations.

== Distribution ==
This species can be found in the Indo-West Pacific.

== Habitat ==
The Blacktip soldierfish inhabits protected waters at depths between 25 and 71 meters, usually in silty reef areas and well developed coral reefs with clear water.
