= Myripristis astakhovi =

Scientific classification
- Domain: Eukaryota
- Kingdom: Animalia
- Phylum: Chordata
- Class: Actinopterygii
- Order: Beryciformes
- Family: Holocentridae
- Genus: Myripristis
- Species: M. astakhovi

Binomial name
- Myripristis astakhovi (Kotlyar, 1997)

Species of fish

Myripristis astakhovi is a species of soldierfish from the genus Myripristis. It is endemic to Nha Trang Bay, Vietnam in the Western Pacific Ocean. It was named in honour of ichthyologist Dmitri Alekseevich Astakhov.
