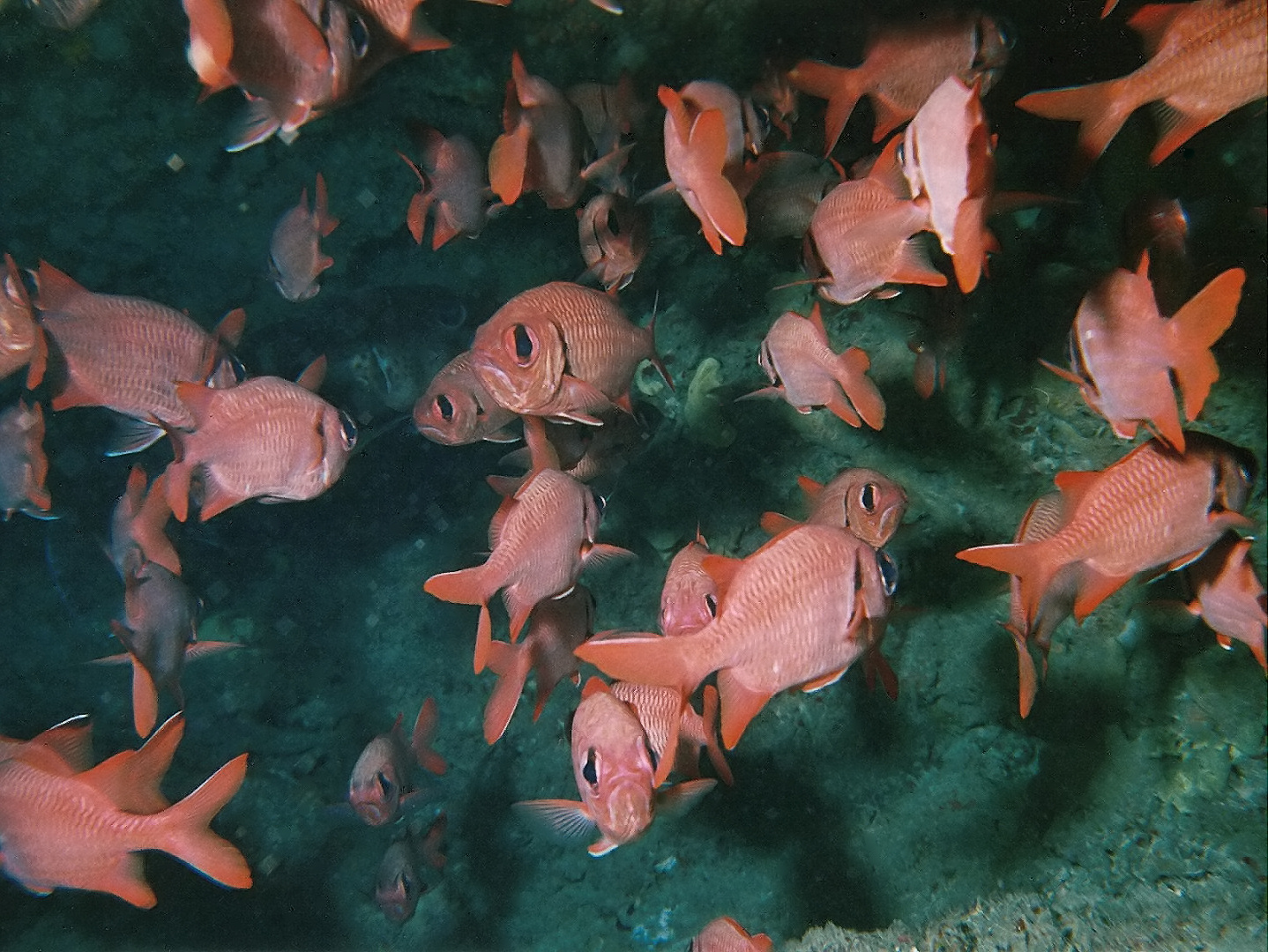

Conservation status
- Least Concern (IUCN 3.1)

Scientific classification
- Kingdom: Animalia
- Phylum: Chordata
- Class: Actinopterygii
- Order: Beryciformes
- Family: Holocentridae
- Genus: Myripristis
- Species: M. pralinia

Binomial name
- Myripristis pralinia (G. Cuvier, 1829)

Synonyms
- Holocentrus pralinius Cuvier, 1829; Ostichthys pralinius Cuvier, 1829; Myripistis kuim Montrouzier, 1857; Myripristis bleekeri Günther, 1859 Myripistis sanguineus Seale & Jordan, 1872; Ostichthys spinicpes Herre, 1908

= Myripristis pralinia =

Species of fish

Myripristis pralinia, the scarlet soldierfish, is a nocturnal species of soldierfish from the genus Myripristis. It can be found in the Indo-Pacific region, from East Africa to the Marquesas Islands and the Gambier Islands, north to the Ryukyu Islands and south to New Caledonia. It can also be found on the Marshall Islands and the Mariana Islands. It can be found in small, loose groups in caves or under ledges in reef flats, lagoons and outer reef slopes. It feeds on plankton.
