= Myripristis tiki =

Conservation status
- Data Deficient (IUCN 3.1)

Scientific classification
- Kingdom: Animalia
- Phylum: Chordata
- Class: Actinopterygii
- Order: Beryciformes
- Family: Holocentridae
- Genus: Myripristis
- Species: M. tiki

Binomial name
- Myripristis tiki (D. W. Greenfield, 1974)

Species of fish

Myripristis tiki, the tiki squirrelfish, is a species of soldierfish belonging to the genus Myripristis. It can be found in the Pacific Ocean in the Cook Islands, Tonga, Pitcairn, the Cook Islands and Easter Island.
