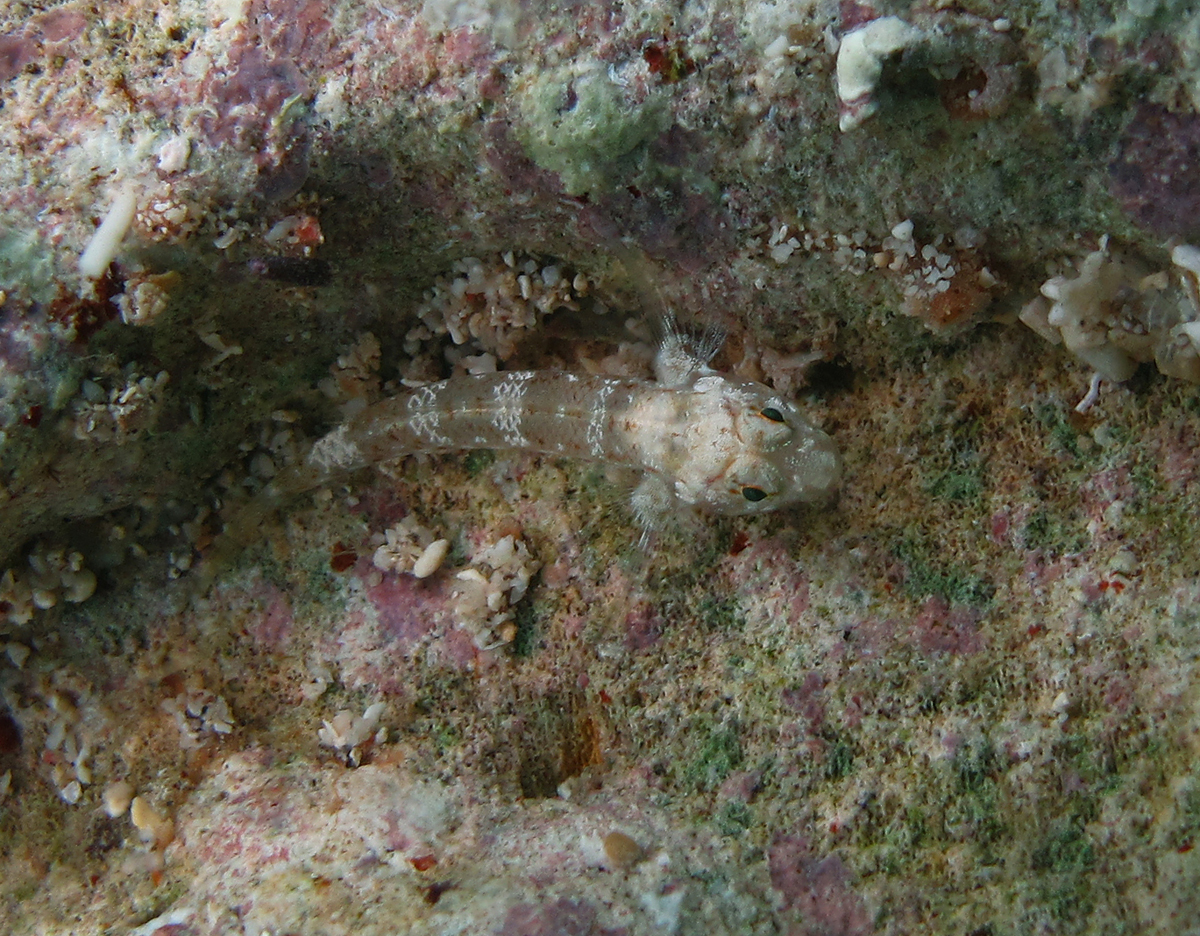
- Cabillus tongarevae juvenile

Scientific classification
- Kingdom: Animalia
- Phylum: Chordata
- Class: Actinopterygii
- Order: Gobiiformes
- Family: Gobiidae
- Subfamily: Gobiinae
- Genus: Cabillus; J. L. B. Smith, 1959

Type species
- Cabillus lacertops J. L. B. Smith, 1959

= Cabillus =

Genus of fishes

Cabillus is a genus of gobies native to the Indian and Pacific oceans.

== Species ==
There are currently eight recognized species in this genus:

- Cabillus atripelvicus J. E. Randall, Ka. Sakamoto & Shibukawa, 2007
- Cabillus caudimacula D. W. Greenfield & J. E. Randall, 2004
- Cabillus lacertops J. L. B. Smith, 1959 (Lizard cabillus)
- Cabillus macrophthalmus (M. C. W. Weber, 1909) (Bigeye cabillus)
- Cabillus nigromarginatus Kovačić & Bogorodsky, 2013
- Cabillus nigrostigmus Kovačić & Bogorodsky, 2013
- Cabillus pexus Shibukawa & Aizawa, 2013
- Cabillus tongarevae (Fowler, 1927) (Tongareva goby)
