= Myripristis xanthacra =

Scientific classification
- Domain: Eukaryota
- Kingdom: Animalia
- Phylum: Chordata
- Class: Actinopterygii
- Order: Beryciformes
- Family: Holocentridae
- Genus: Myripristis
- Species: M. xanthacra

Binomial name
- Myripristis xanthacra (J. E. Randall & Guézé, 1981)

Species of fish

Myripristis xanthacra, the yellowtip soldierfish, is a species of soldierfish belonging to the genus Myripristis. It can be found in the Western Indian Ocean in the southern half of the Red Sea and in Djibouti in the Gulf of Aden. It inhabits reef flats and slopes at depths below 18m.
