= Myripristis greenfieldi =

Scientific classification
- Kingdom: Animalia
- Phylum: Chordata
- Class: Actinopterygii
- Order: Beryciformes
- Family: Holocentridae
- Genus: Myripristis
- Species: M. greenfieldi

Binomial name
- Myripristis greenfieldi (J. E. Randall & Yamakawa, 1996)

Species of fish

Myripristis greenfieldi is a species of soldierfish belonging to the genus Myripristis. It is believed to be endemic to Japan, the Ogasawara islands and the Ryukyu Islands in the North-western Pacific Ocean. It is named after ichthyologist David W. Greenfield. It is demersal.
