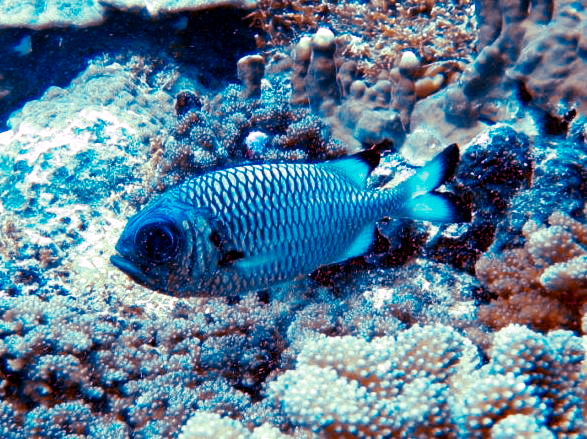

Conservation status
- Least Concern (IUCN 3.1)

Scientific classification
- Kingdom: Animalia
- Phylum: Chordata
- Class: Actinopterygii
- Order: Beryciformes
- Family: Holocentridae
- Genus: Myripristis
- Species: M. adusta

Binomial name
- Myripristis adusta Bleeker, 1853

= Myripristis adusta =

Species of fish

Myripristis adusta, common name shadowfin soldierfish, is a species of soldierfish belonging to the family Holocentridae.

== Description ==
This species grows to a length of 35 centimetres (14 in) TL. The body is oval and laterally compressed and the scales are quite large. The eyes are large, as this fish is mainly nocturnal. The basic colour is pale pink, with deep blue to black scale margins. Median and caudal fins show a broad deep blue to black outer border. These fishes usually aggregate in small groups, often in mixed-species and mainly feed on plankton.

== Distribution ==
Myripristis berndti is widespread in the Indian and Pacific Oceans.

== Habitat ==
This nocturnal species can be found on tropical reefs hiding in caves or under ledges by day, at depths of from 1 to 25 metres (3.3 to 82.0 ft).
