= Myripristis woodsi =

Conservation status
- Least Concern (IUCN 3.1)

Scientific classification
- Kingdom: Animalia
- Phylum: Chordata
- Class: Actinopterygii
- Order: Beryciformes
- Family: Holocentridae
- Genus: Myripristis
- Species: M. woodsi

Binomial name
- Myripristis woodsi (D. W. Greenfield, 1974)

Species of fish

Myripristis woodsi, the whitespot soldierfish, is a species of soldierfish belonging to the genus Myripristis. It is found in the Pacific Ocean, in all of Oceania except Hawaii, the Solomon Islands, New Caledonia, the Caroline Islands, the Line Islands, and north to the Bonin Islands and Marcus Island and south to Samoa and the Tuamoto Islands. It inhabits reef flats, lagoons and seaward reefs. It can be commonly found on exposed outer-reef areas, often at low islands or atolls. It feeds on zooplankton. It is named in honour of ichthyologist Loren Paul Woods.
