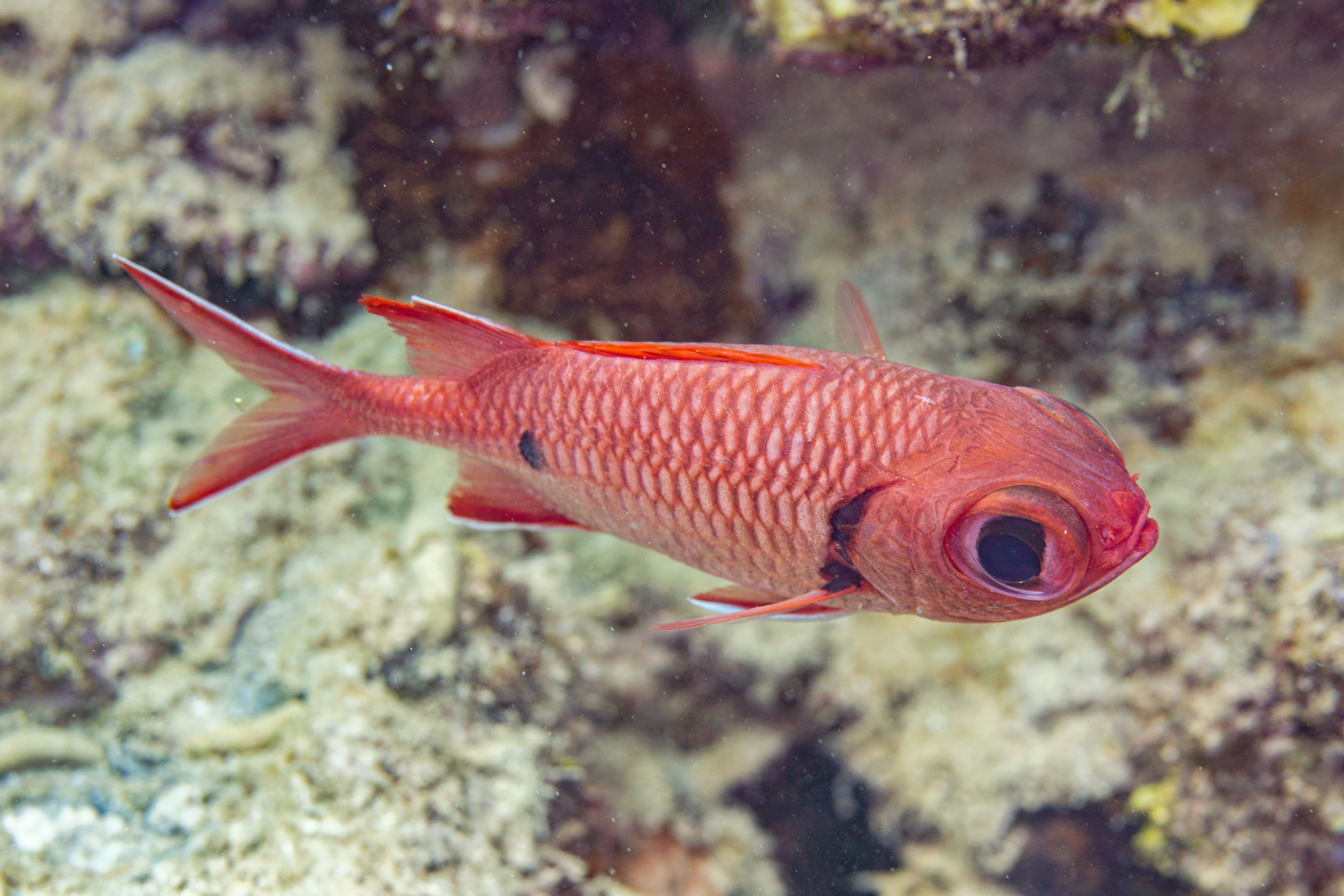

Conservation status
- Least Concern (IUCN 3.1)

Scientific classification
- Kingdom: Animalia
- Phylum: Chordata
- Class: Actinopterygii
- Order: Beryciformes
- Family: Holocentridae
- Genus: Myripristis
- Species: M. murdjan

Binomial name
- Myripristis murdjan Forsskål, 1775

= Myripristis murdjan =

Species of fish

Myripristis murdjan is a species of soldierfish found in the Indo-Pacific.
