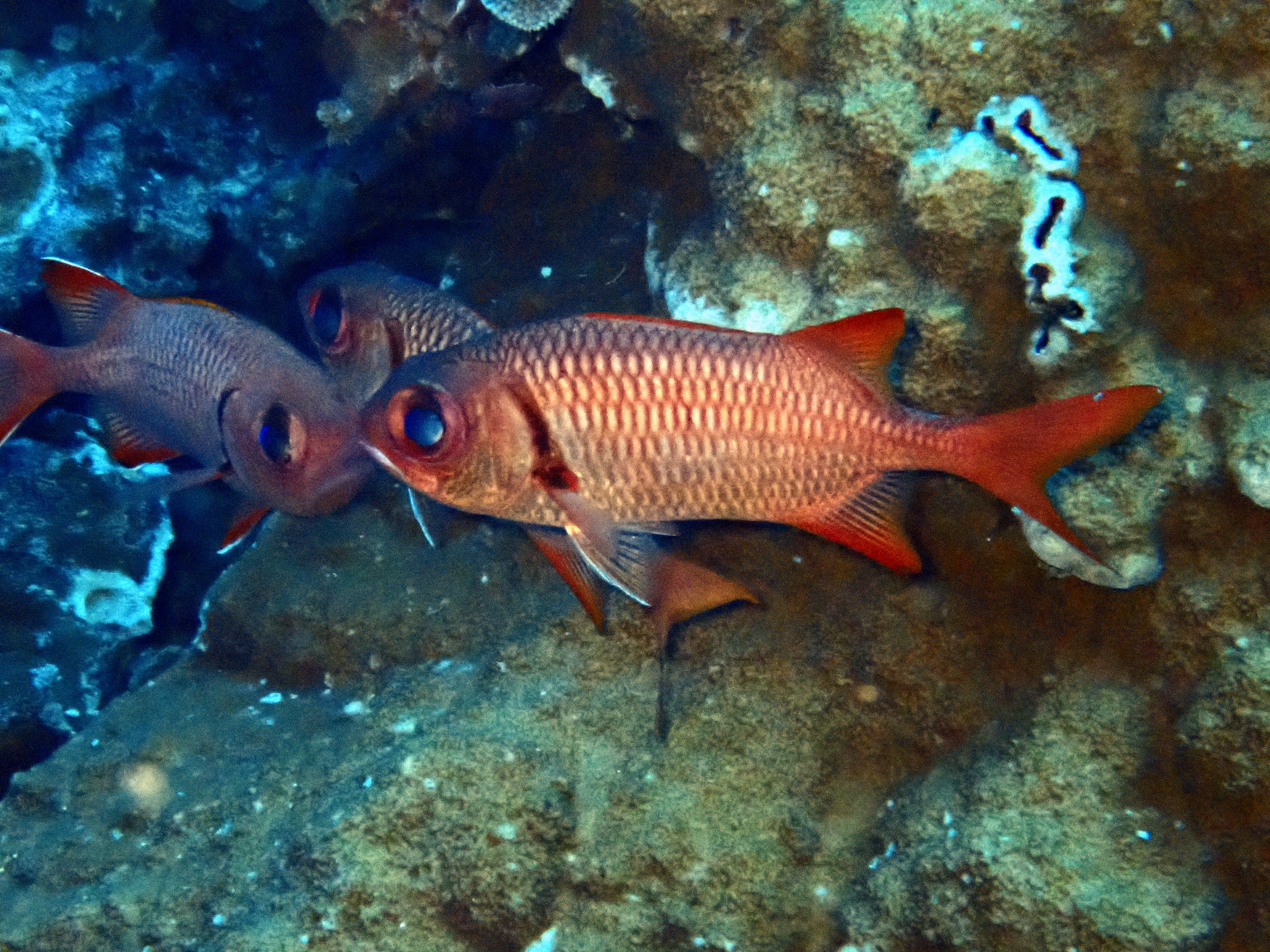

Conservation status
- Least Concern (IUCN 3.1)

Scientific classification
- Kingdom: Animalia
- Phylum: Chordata
- Class: Actinopterygii
- Division: Teleostei
- Order: Beryciformes
- Family: Holocentridae
- Genus: Myripristis
- Species: M. amaena

Binomial name
- Myripristis amaena (Castelnau, 1873)

= Myripristis amaena =

Species of ray-finned fish

Myripristis amaena, also known as the brick soldierfish or redfin soldierfish, is a species of fish in the family Holocentridae found in the Pacific Ocean. It is reef fish, often inhabiting caves and rock ledges.

== Description ==
Myripristis amaena has a reddish coloring on the upper portion of its dorsal fin and can be distinguished from the closely related Myripristis berndti by the absence of a white leading edge on its median fins. It reaches a maximum size of about 26.5 cm (10.5 in) and has 32–36 lateral-line scales. Individuals reach sexual maturity at approximately 145–160 mm standard length.

Myripristis amaena is a slow-growing species that matures at around 6 years of age. It is considered long-lived for a reef fish, with individuals in Hawaiʻi documented to live at least 14 years, while individuals in American Samoa have been recorded reaching more than 17 years of age. M. amaena grows slowly and lives a long time, which may make it more vulnerable to overfishing compared to shorter-lived reef fish, and it has been suggested that fisheries managers should take this into account. Spawning activity peaks from early April to early May, with a smaller secondary peak occurring in September.

== Distribution and habitat ==
Myripristis amaena is found in the Pacific Ocean. Its range spans from Indonesia and the Philippines, Hawaii and Ducie Island, north to Ryukyu and Minami-Tori-shima, and south to Micronesia. During the day, M. amaena hides in caves or under ledges, generally at depths of less than 30 feet, and comes out at night to feed. It is nocturnal and feeds mostly on meroplankton like crab megalops, hermit crab larvae, and shrimp. It also eats some benthic prey.
