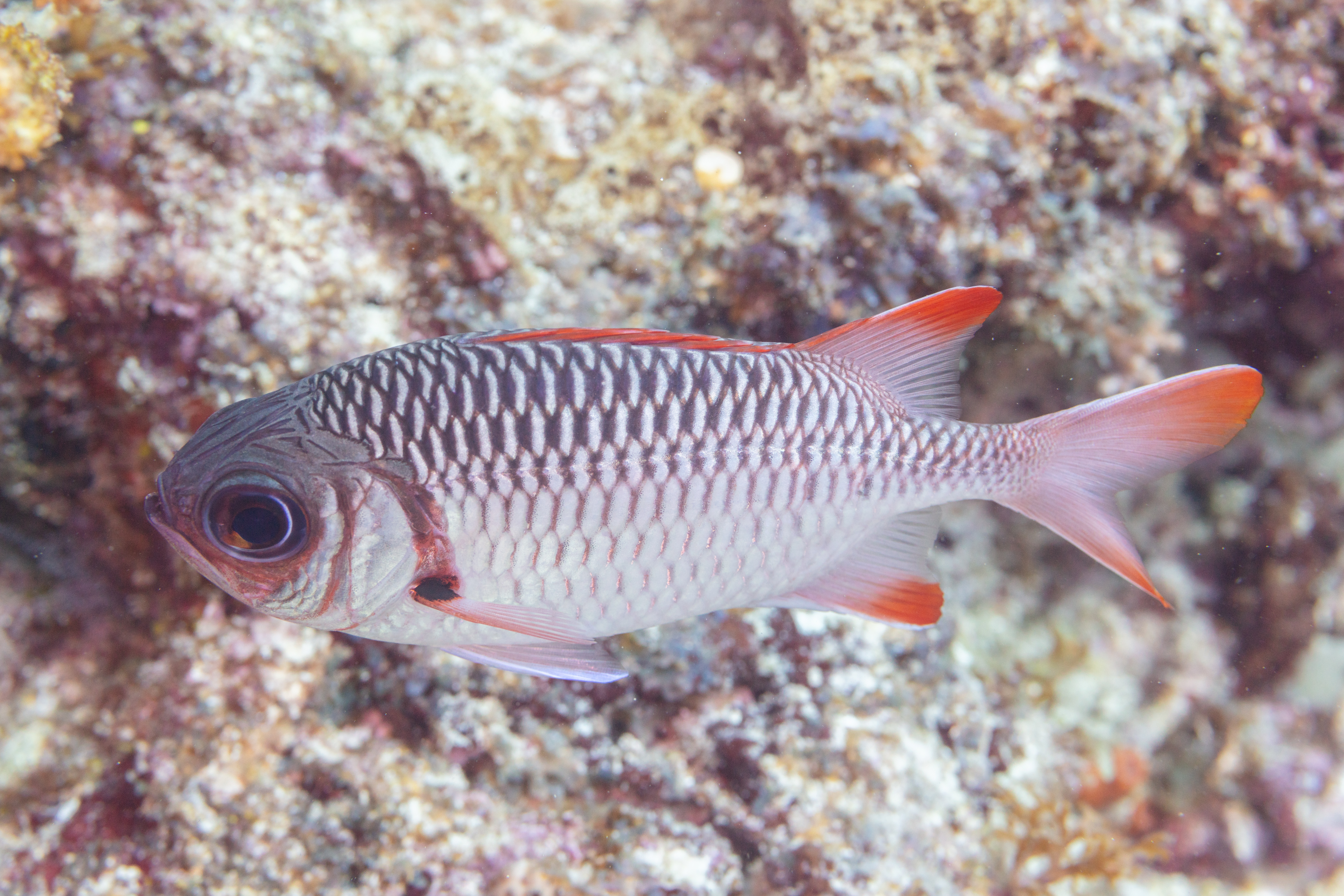

Conservation status
- Least Concern (IUCN 3.1)

Scientific classification
- Kingdom: Animalia
- Phylum: Chordata
- Class: Actinopterygii
- Order: Beryciformes
- Family: Holocentridae
- Genus: Myripristis
- Species: M. violacea

Binomial name
- Myripristis violacea Bleeker, 1851

= Myripristis violacea =

Species of fish

Myripristis violacea is a species of fish in the family Holocentridae found in the Indo-Pacific Ocean

Mypripristis violacea abides in coral - reefs in shallow, protected water of bays and lagoons. It stays in caves or crevices during daytime and searches for food at night. The known depth range for Myripristis violacea is 1–30m.
