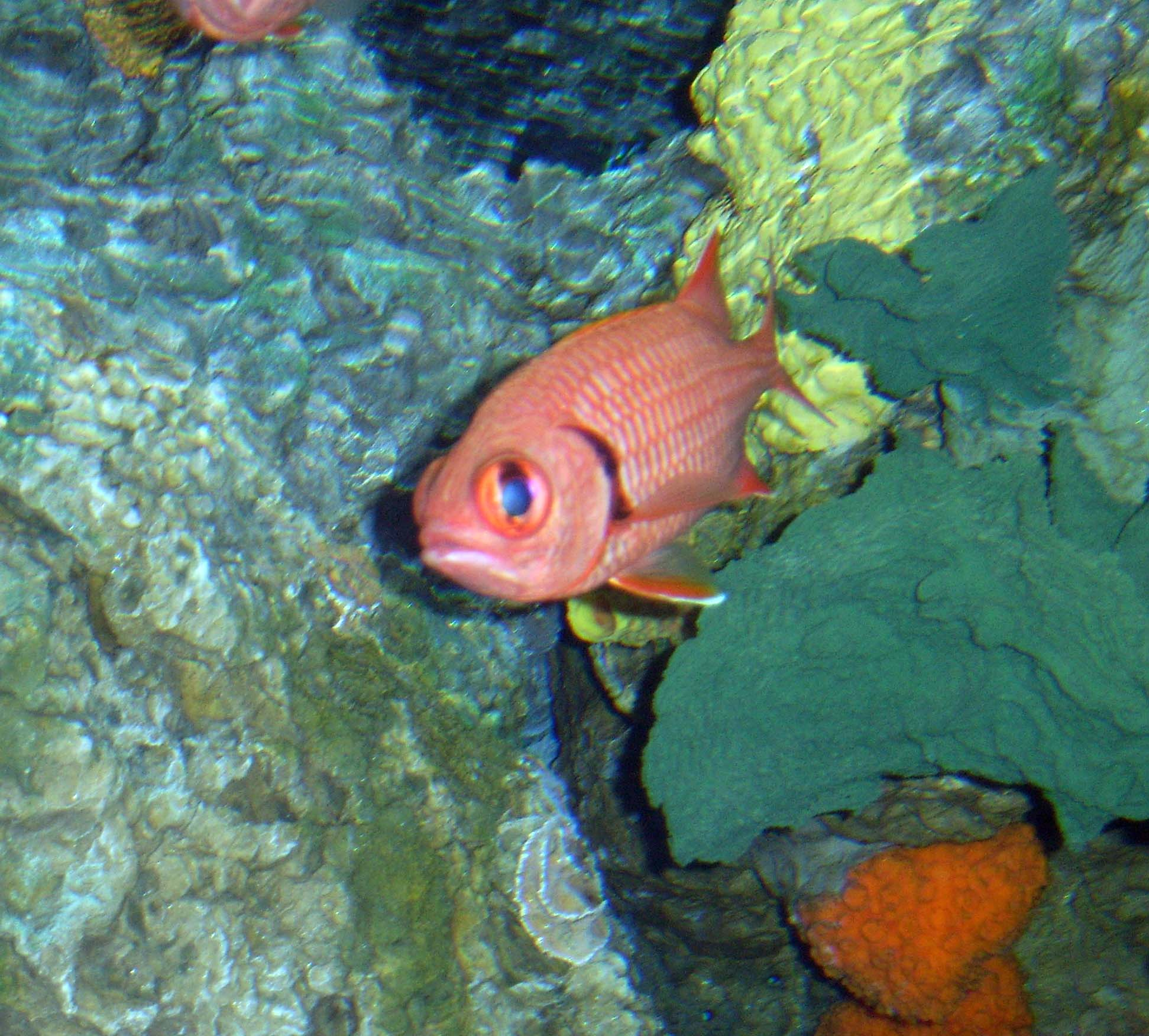

Conservation status
- Least Concern (IUCN 3.1)

Scientific classification
- Kingdom: Animalia
- Phylum: Chordata
- Class: Actinopterygii
- Order: Beryciformes
- Family: Holocentridae
- Genus: Myripristis
- Species: M. berndti

Binomial name
- Myripristis berndti D. S. Jordan & Evermann, 1903

= Blotcheye soldierfish =

Species of fish

The blotcheye soldierfish (Myripristis berndti) is a species of soldierfish belonging to the family Holocentridae.

== Description ==
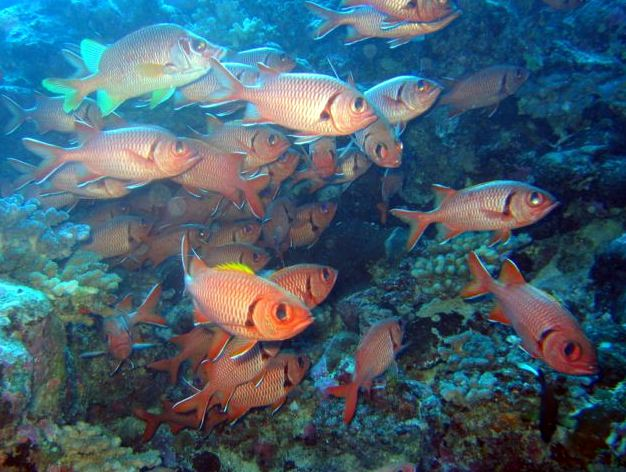
Mixed-species aggregation of Myripristis berndti

The species grows to a length of 30 centimetres (12 in) TL. The body is oval and laterally compressed, and the scales are quite large. The basic colour is silvery pink to pale yellowish, with red scale margins. The opercular membrane is black. The dorsal fin is large and spiny, ranging from yellow to orange-yellow, and the other fins are red with white edges. The eyes are large, because the species is mainly nocturnal. The lower jaw protrudes beyond the upper jaw when mouth is closed. They usually aggregate in mixed-species and mainly feed on plankton. It is a target of commercial fisheries and can also be found in the aquarium trade.

== Distribution and habitat ==
Myripristis berndti is widespread in the Indian and Pacific oceans. It can be found on tropical reefs, hiding in caves or under ledges, at depths of from 1 to 50 metres (3 to 164 ft).
