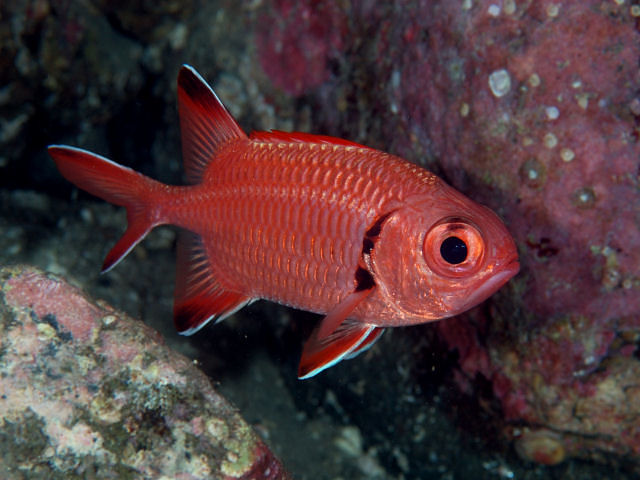

Scientific classification
- Kingdom: Animalia
- Phylum: Chordata
- Class: Actinopterygii
- Order: Beryciformes
- Family: Holocentridae
- Genus: Myripristis
- Species: M. kochiensis

Binomial name
- Myripristis kochiensis J. E. Randall & Yamakawa, 1996

= Myripristis kochiensis =

Species of fish

Myripristis kochiensis is a species of fish in the family Holocentridae found in the Northwest Pacific.
