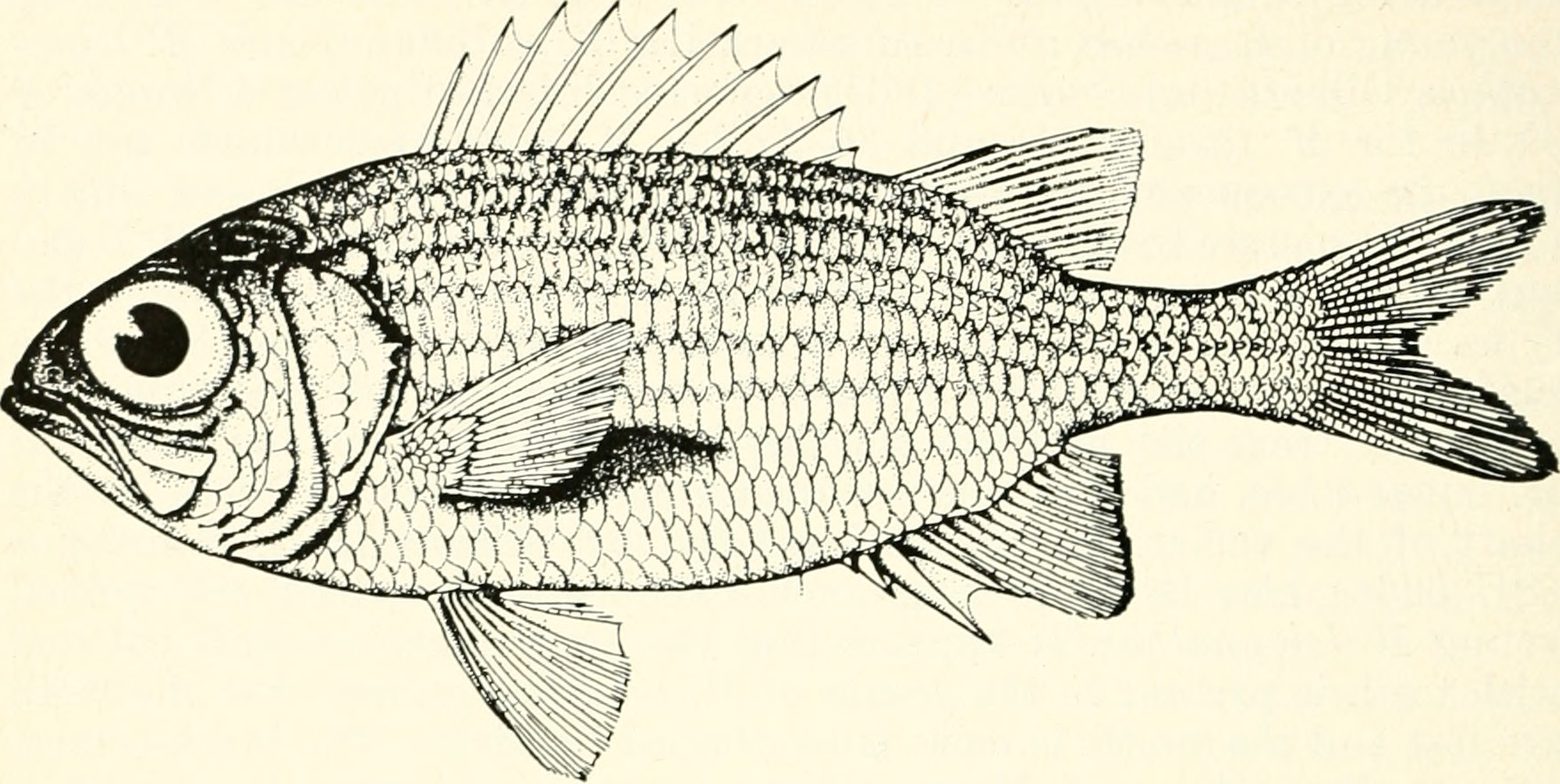
- Myripristis clarionensis

Conservation status
- Vulnerable (IUCN 3.1)

Scientific classification
- Domain: Eukaryota
- Kingdom: Animalia
- Phylum: Chordata
- Class: Actinopterygii
- Order: Beryciformes
- Family: Holocentridae
- Genus: Myripristis
- Species: M. clarionensis

Binomial name
- Myripristis clarionensis C.H. Gilbert, 1897

= Myripristis clarionensis =

Species of fish

Myripristis clarionensis, the yellow soldierfish, is a species of fish in the family Holocentridae found in the eastern Pacific Ocean, primarily concentrated around the Revillagigedo Islands and Clipperton Island. They are reef fish.
