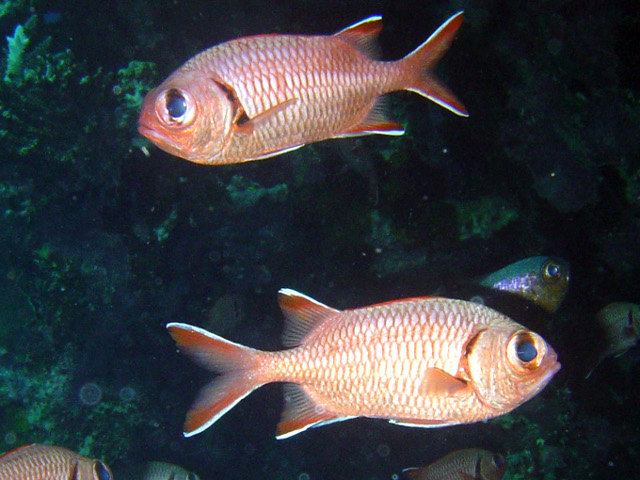
- Pinecone soldierfish (M. murdjan)
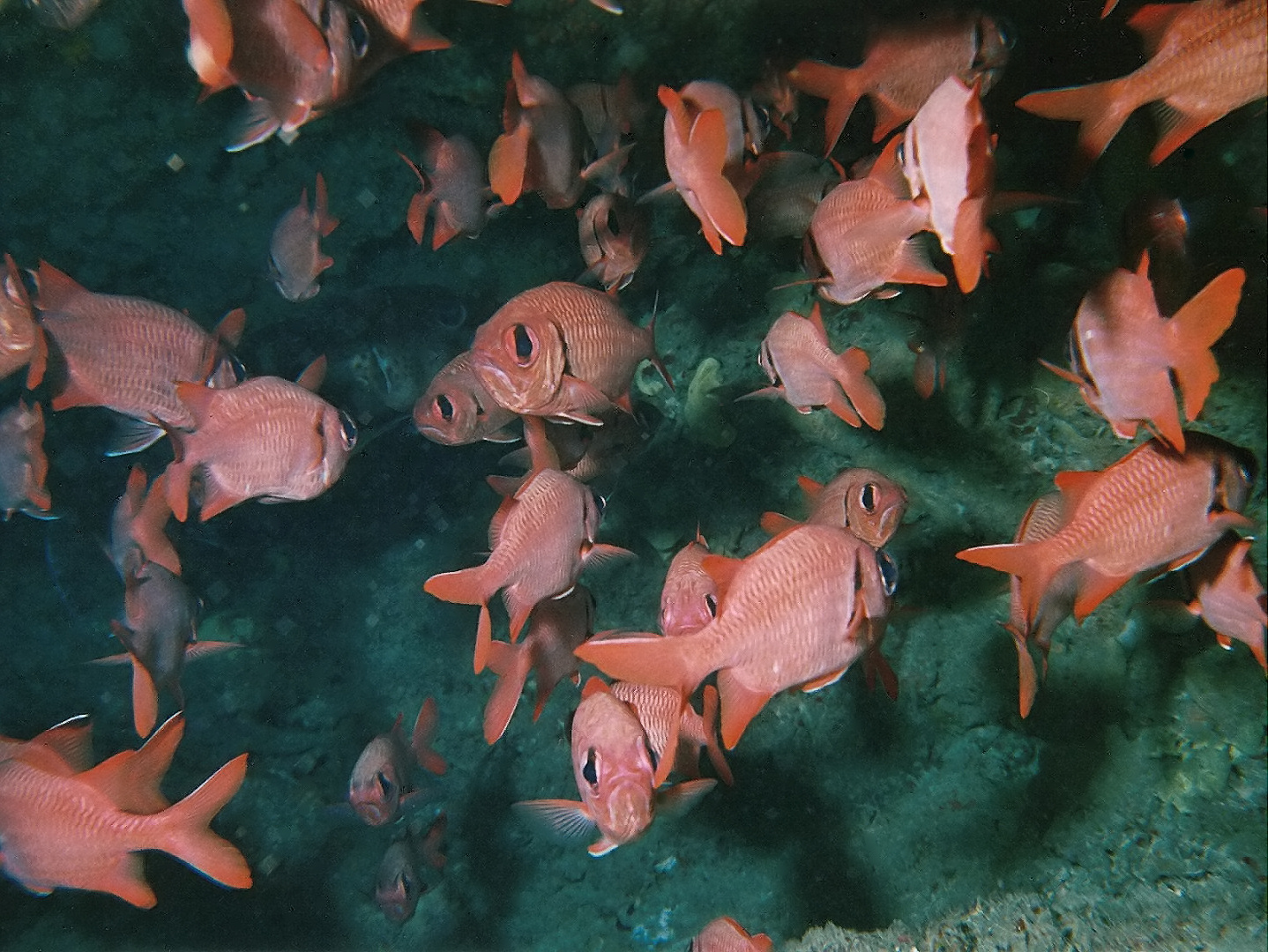
- Scarlet soldierfish (M. pralinia)

Scientific classification
- Kingdom: Animalia
- Phylum: Chordata
- Class: Actinopterygii
- Order: Beryciformes
- Family: Holocentridae
- Subfamily: Myripristinae
- Genus: Myripristis; G. Cuvier, 1829

Synonyms
- Myriopristis (misspelling); Myripristes (misspelling); Neomyripristis Castelnau, 1873

= Myripristis =

Myripristis Temporal range: Middle Miocene–present

Genus of fishes

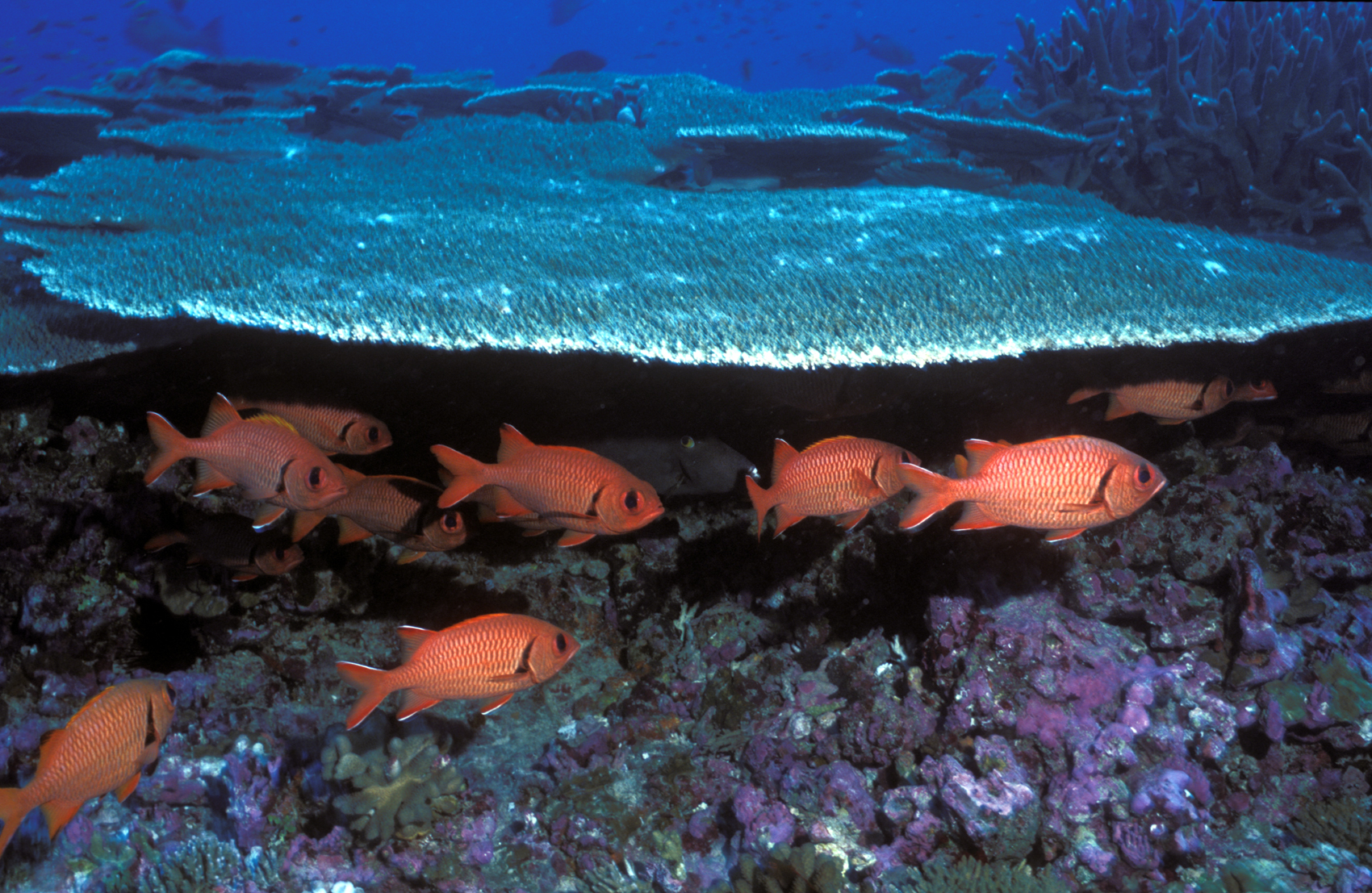
Myripristis (Soldierfish) Baker Island NWR

Myripristis is a genus of soldierfishes.

== Species ==
There are currently 28 recognized species in this genus:

- Myripristis adusta Bleeker, 1853 (Shadowfin soldierfish)
- Myripristis amaena (Castelnau, 1873) (Brick soldierfish)
- Myripristis astakhovi Kotlyar, 1997
- Myripristis aulacodes J. E. Randall & D. W. Greenfield, 1996
- Myripristis berndti D. S. Jordan & Evermann, 1903 (Blotcheye soldierfish)
- Myripristis botche G. Cuvier, 1829 (Blacktip soldierfish)
- Myripristis chryseres D. S. Jordan & Evermann, 1903 (Yellowfin soldierfish)
- Myripristis clarionensis C. H. Gilbert, 1897 (Yellow soldierfish)
- Myripristis earlei J. E. Randall, G. R. Allen & D. R. Robertson, 2003 (Earle's soldierfish)
- Myripristis formosa J. E. Randall & D. W. Greenfield, 1996
- Myripristis gildi D. W. Greenfield, 1965 (Clipperton cardinal soldierfish)
- Myripristis greenfieldi J. E. Randall & Yamakawa, 1996
- Myripristis hexagona (Lacépède, 1802) (Doubletooth soldierfish)
- Myripristis jacobus G. Cuvier, 1829 (Blackbar soldierfish)
- Myripristis kochiensis J. E. Randall & Yamakawa, 1996
- Myripristis kuntee Valenciennes, 1831 (Shoulderbar soldierfish)
- Myripristis leiognathus Valenciennes, 1846 (Panamic soldierfish)
- Myripristis murdjan (Forsskål, 1775) (Pinecone soldierfish)
- Myripristis pralinia G. Cuvier, 1829 (Scarlet soldierfish)
- Myripristis randalli D. W. Greenfield, 1974
- Myripristis robusta J. E. Randall & D. W. Greenfield, 1996
- Myripristis seychellensis G. Cuvier, 1829 (Seychelles soldier)
- Myripristis tiki D. W. Greenfield, 1974 (Tiki soldierfish)
- Myripristis trachyacron Bleeker, 1863
- Myripristis violacea Bleeker, 1851 (Lattice soldierfish)
- Myripristis vittata Valenciennes, 1831 (Whitetip soldierfish)
- Myripristis woodsi D. W. Greenfield, 1974 (Whitespot soldierfish)
- Myripristis xanthacra J. E. Randall & Guézé, 1981 (Yellowtip soldierfish)

The following fossil species are also known:

- †Myripristis schaubi Casier, 1954 (Miocene of Indonesia)
- †Myripristis sorbinii Bannikov, 1987 (Middle Miocene of Azerbaijan)
