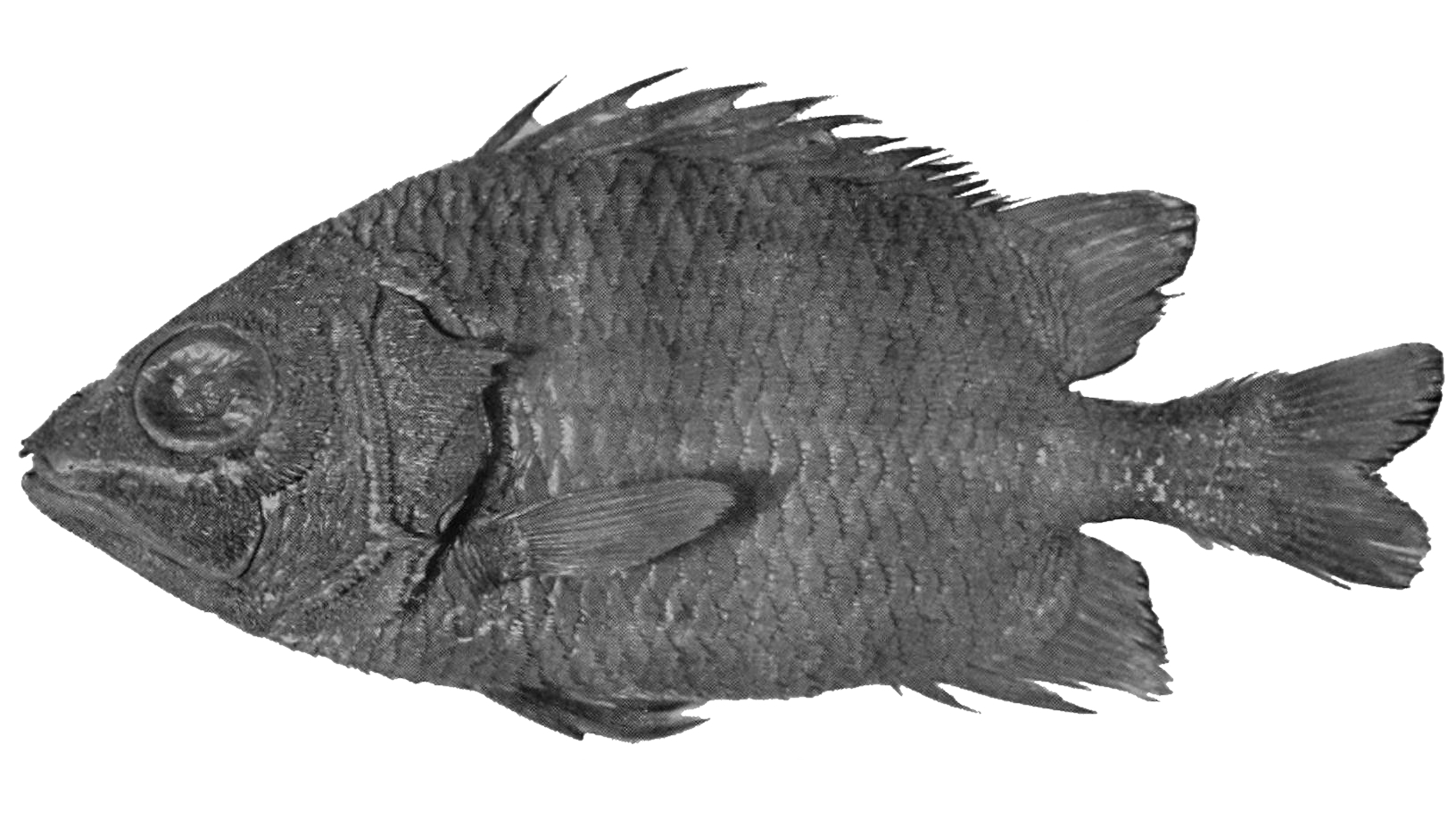
- Holotype

Conservation status
- Least Concern (IUCN 3.1)

Scientific classification
- Kingdom: Animalia
- Phylum: Chordata
- Class: Actinopterygii
- Order: Beryciformes
- Family: Holocentridae
- Genus: Pristilepis; J. E. Randall, Shimizu & Yamakawa, 1982
- Species: P. oligolepis

Binomial name
- Pristilepis oligolepis (Whitley, 1941)

Synonyms
- Holotrachys oligolepis Whitley, 1941

= Pristilepis =

Species of fish

Pristilepis oligolepis, the spinyface soldier, is a species of soldierfish found in association with reefs in the Indian and Pacific Oceans. It can be found at depths of from 14 to 220 metres (46 to 722 ft). This species grows to a length of 30 centimetres (12 in) TL. This species is the only known member of the genus Pristilepis.
