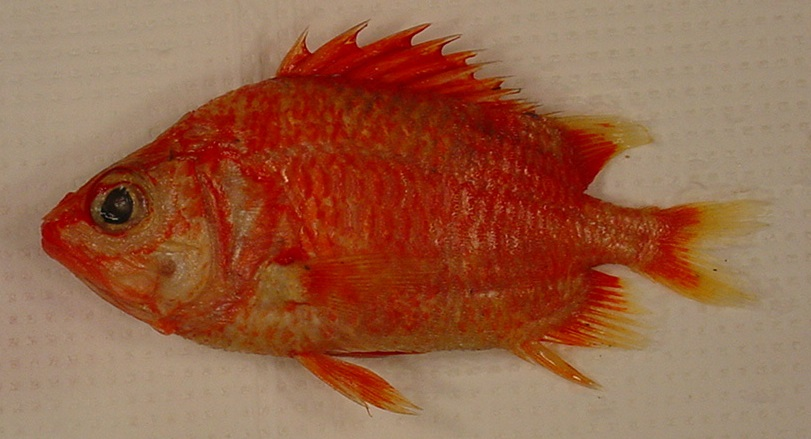

Conservation status
- Least Concern (IUCN 3.1)

Scientific classification
- Kingdom: Animalia
- Phylum: Chordata
- Class: Actinopterygii
- Order: Beryciformes
- Family: Holocentridae
- Subfamily: Myripristinae
- Genus: Corniger; Agassiz, 1831
- Species: C. spinosus

Binomial name
- Corniger spinosus Agassiz, 1831

= Spinycheek soldierfish =

Species of fish

The spinycheek soldierfish (Corniger spinosus) is a species of soldierfish found in the Atlantic Ocean at depths of 45 to 275 metres (148 to 902 ft). This species grows to a length of 20 centimetres (7.9 in) TL. It is the only known member of genus Corniger.

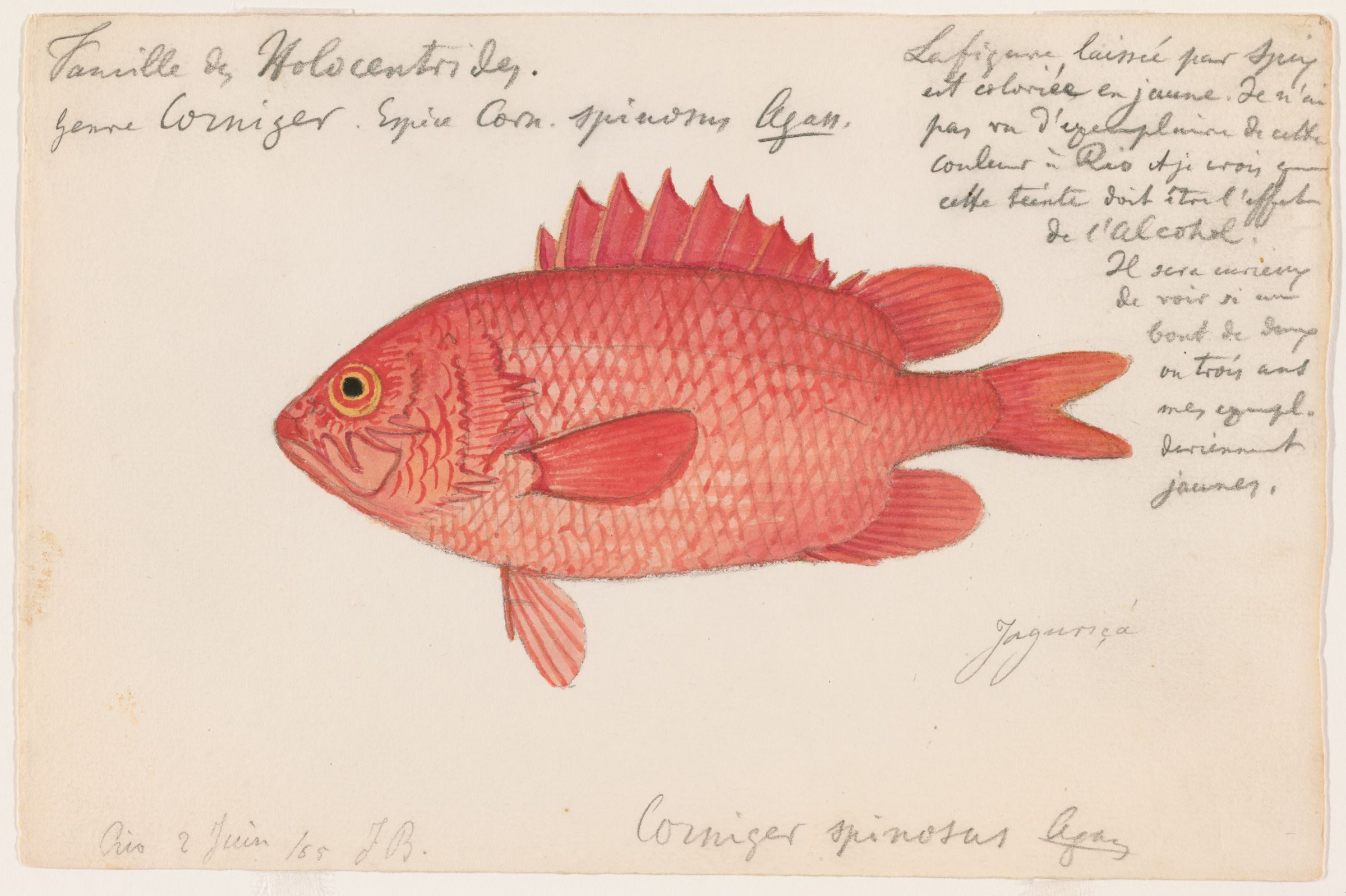
An 1865 watercolor spinycheek soldierfish painting by Jacques Burkhardt.
