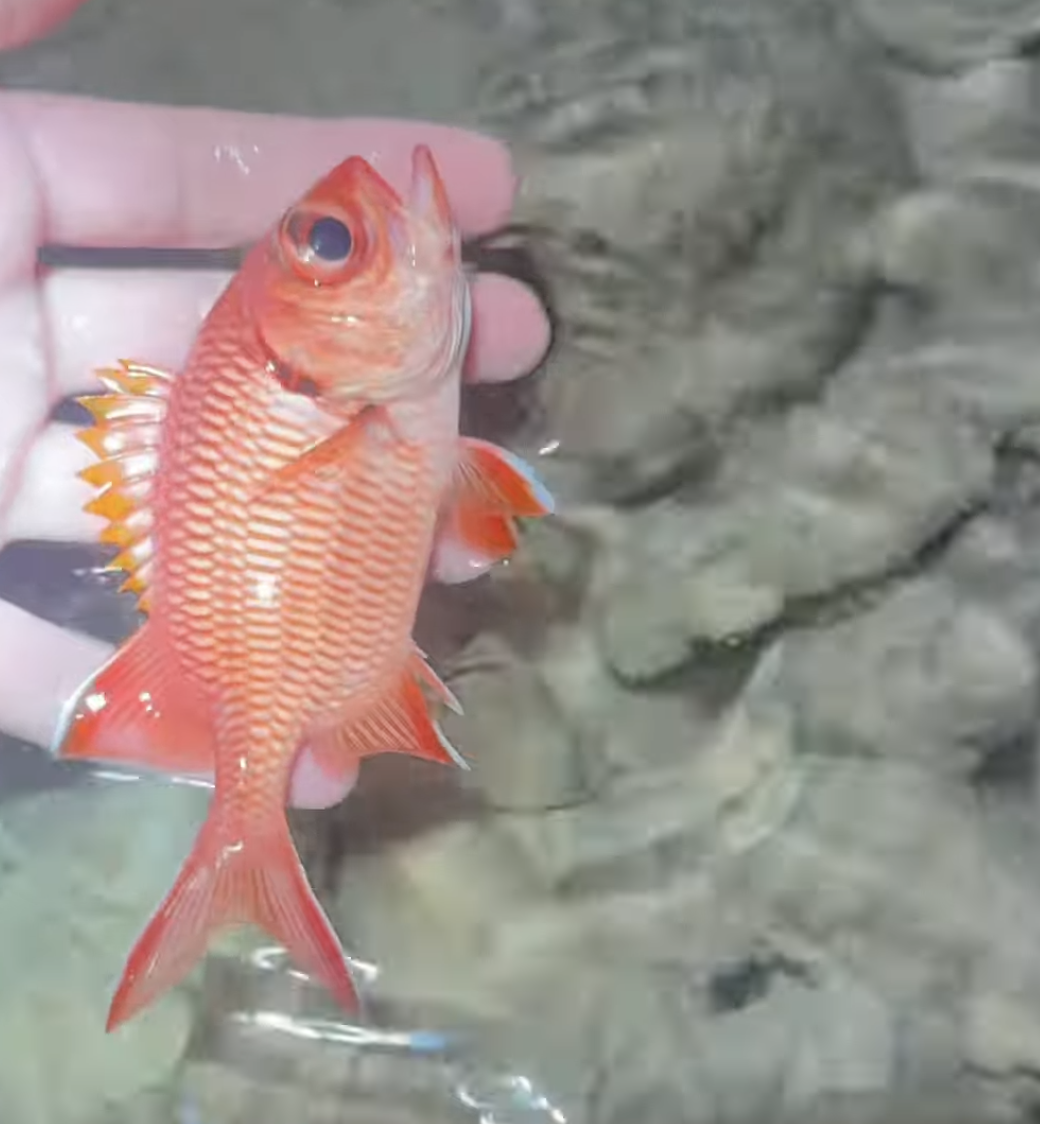
- Whitetip Soldierfish caught in full moon off coast of Hawaii

Conservation status
- Least Concern (IUCN 3.1)

Scientific classification
- Kingdom: Animalia
- Phylum: Chordata
- Class: Actinopterygii
- Order: Beryciformes
- Family: Holocentridae
- Genus: Myripristis
- Species: M. vittata

Binomial name
- Myripristis vittata Valenciennes, 1831

= Myripristis vittata =

Species of fish

Myripristis vittata, or the whitetip soldierfish, is a soldierfish from the Indo-Pacific.

== Description ==
It grows to a size of 25 centimeters in length or about 9.8 inches. This species is usually found in small groups and sometimes forms large schools.

== Distribution and habitat ==
Myripristis vittata is recorded to live in the areas of Indo-Pacific, mainly from oceanic islands, from the Mascarene Islands and Seychelles to French Polynesia, and the Hawaiian Islands. Myripristis vittata is found in marine environments within reef-associated areas. They occupy the depth range of about 3 – 80 meters, but more specifically this species stays in the depth range of about 15 – 80 meters. This species is native to a tropical environment. They are recorded to swim upside down occasionally. This species is nocturnal and it feeds on plankton.

== Uses ==
Myripristis vittata occasionally makes its way into the aquarium trade.

== Notes ==
- Froese, Rainer; Pauly, Daniel (eds.). "Myripristis vittata". FishBase. December 2008 version.
