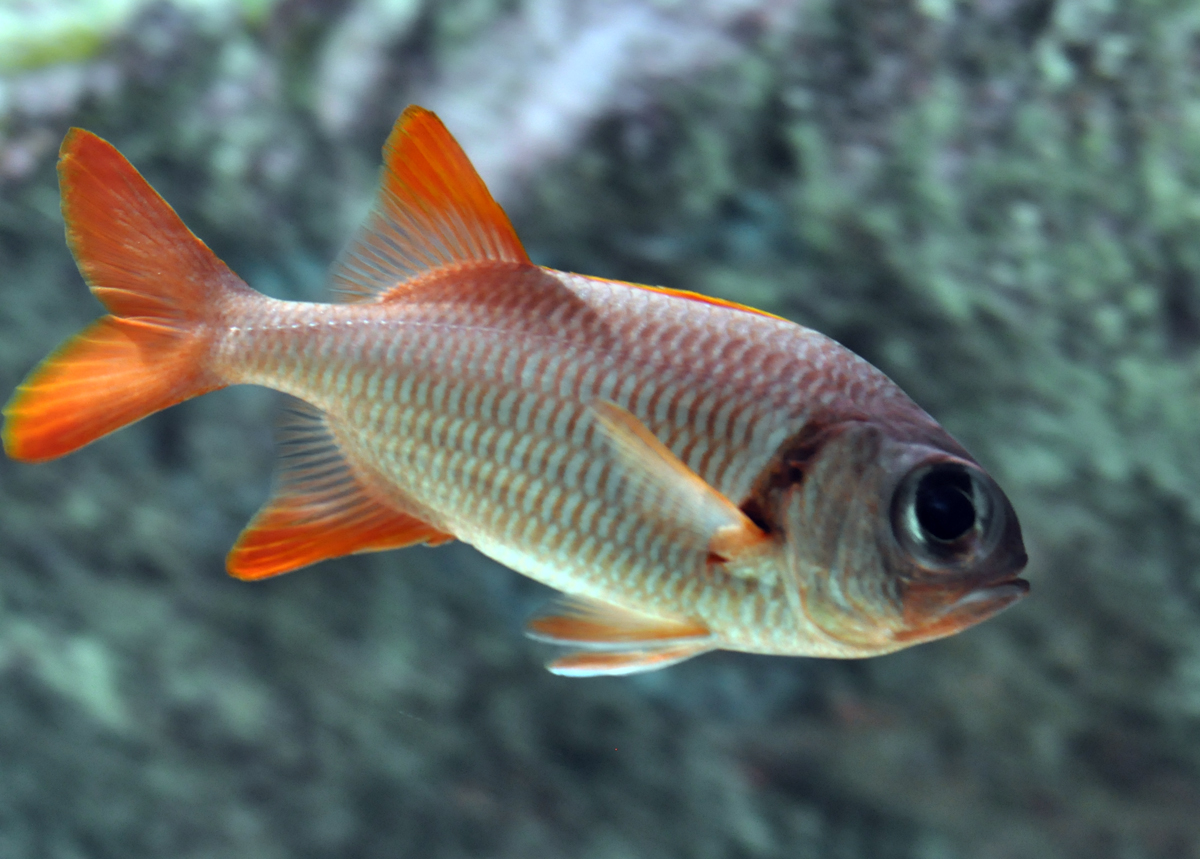

Conservation status
- Least Concern (IUCN 3.1)

Scientific classification
- Kingdom: Animalia
- Phylum: Chordata
- Class: Actinopterygii
- Division: Teleostei
- Order: Beryciformes
- Family: Holocentridae
- Genus: Myripristis
- Species: M. kuntee

Binomial name
- Myripristis kuntee Valenciennes, 1831

= Myripristis kuntee =

Species of ray-finned fish

Myripristis kuntee, commonly known as the shoulderbar soldierfish or pearly soldierfish, is a species of fish in the family Holocentridae. It is found over a wide area the Indo-Pacific and is common in some places.

== Description ==
Myripristis kuntee has a V-shaped tail fin. It has a red upper body and a silvery-pink lower body, with a reddish-brown bar behind its head. Females, compared with males, have broader jaws and larger eyes. This species can grow up to 26 cm (10 in) in length, approximately the size of a dinner plate. Its diet mainly consists of shrimp, crabs, krill, Artemia, and other fish.

== Distribution and habitat ==
Myripristis kuntee can be found across the tropical Indo-Pacific, from East Africa and South Africa east to French Polynesia and the Hawaiian Islands. This species thrives in darkness; it finds refuge in caves and crevices around reefs during the day. At night, it comes out of hiding and searches for food.

== Behavior and sensory adaptations ==
Myripristis kuntee's eyes have adapted to dark environments. Its eyes contain four layers of light-sensitive rods. Each layer enhances the eyes' capability to capture light in dark environments. When spooked by large predators or by divers, it produces sounds similar to grunting or knocking noises.
