= Cabillus caudimacula =

Scientific classification
- Kingdom: Animalia
- Phylum: Chordata
- Class: Actinopterygii
- Order: Gobiiformes
- Family: Gobiidae
- Genus: Cabillus
- Species: C. caudimacula

Binomial name
- Cabillus caudimacula Greenfield and Randall, 2004

Species of fish

Cabillus caudimacula is a small species of ray-finned fish in the family Gobiidae. It is endemic to the Hawaiian Islands.
