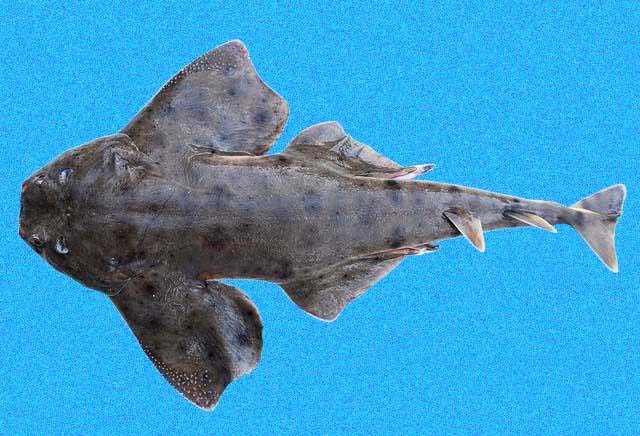

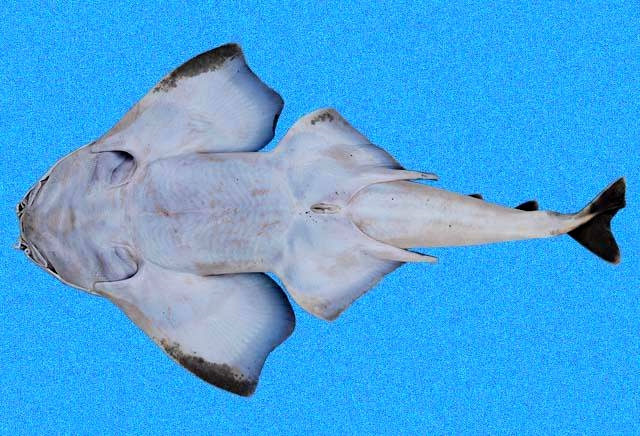

Conservation status
- Critically Endangered (IUCN 3.1)

Scientific classification
- Kingdom: Animalia
- Phylum: Chordata
- Class: Chondrichthyes
- Subclass: Elasmobranchii
- Division: Selachii
- Order: Squatiniformes
- Family: Squatinidae
- Genus: Squatina
- Species: S. armata

Binomial name
- Squatina armata (Philippi, 1887)
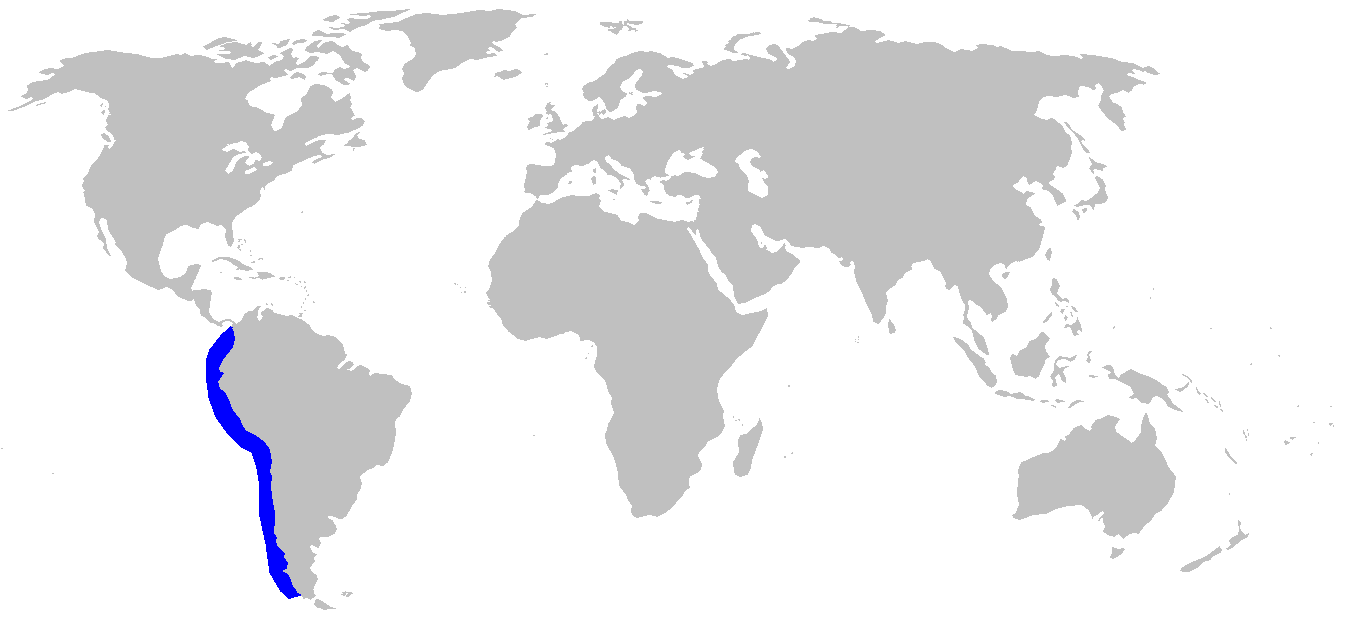
- Range of Chilean angelshark (in blue)

= Chilean angelshark =

Species of shark

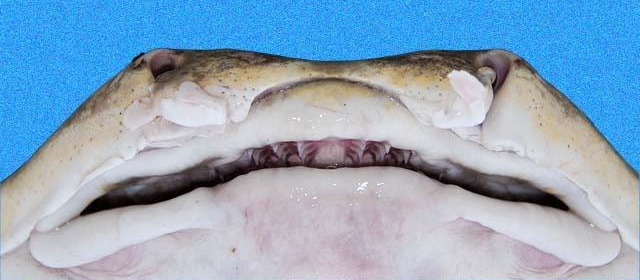
Head

The Chilean angelshark (Squatina armata) is an angelshark of the family Squatinidae found in the subtropical waters of Chile, that grows up to 1.03 metres (3 ft 5 in) in length. The holotype is lost. The species was redescribed and a neotype designated in 2024. Reproduction is ovoviviparous.

== Diet ==
The Chilean angelshark mainly consumes lizardfish, teleosts and their remains, crustaceans, mollusks, elasmobranchs, and some species of shrimp. The species can be labeled as a selective, piscivorous, and carcinophagus predator. They were also found to be specialist predators, meaning that they only feed on limited prey types and in specific environments.
