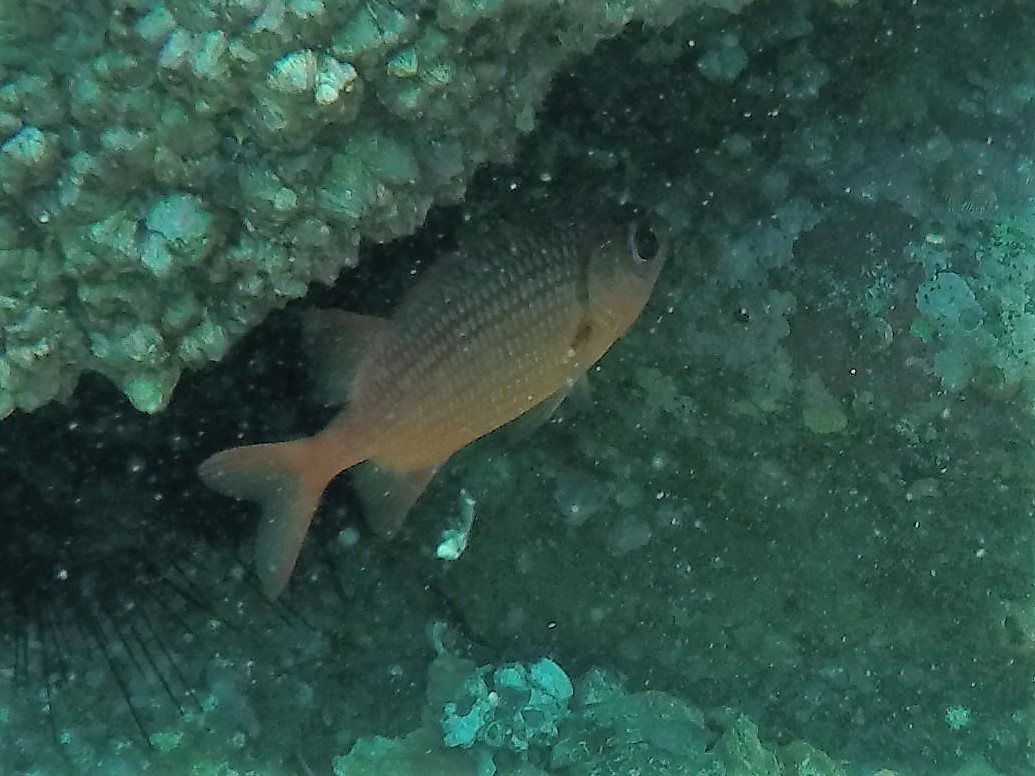

Conservation status
- Least Concern (IUCN 3.1)

Scientific classification
- Kingdom: Animalia
- Phylum: Chordata
- Class: Actinopterygii
- Order: Beryciformes
- Family: Holocentridae
- Genus: Myripristis
- Species: M. leiognathus

Binomial name
- Myripristis leiognathus Valenciennes, 1846

= Myripristis leiognathus =

Species of fish

Myripristis leiognathus is a species of fish in the family Holocentridae found in the eastern Pacific Ocean. Their range spans from the Gulf of California to the coast of Ecuador, and outwards to the Galapagos, the Revillagigedo Islands, and Cocos Island. They are reef fish, often found hiding out at caves and rock ledges during the day and feeding on crustaceans at night. They are occasionally fished for, and sold by fishmongers.
