= David W. Greenfield =

American ichthyologist (born 1940)

David Wayne Greenfield
- Born: April 21, 1940 (age 86); Carmel, California, United States
- Education: Humboldt State University (B.A., 1962); University of Washington (Ph.D., 1966)
- Known for: Systematics and zoogeography of reef fishes; descriptions of new fish species
- Spouse: Teresa Arámbula Greenfield
- Children: 1
- Scientific career
- Fields: Ichthyology, Marine biology, Ecology, Zoogeography
- Workplaces: Field Museum of Natural History; California State University, Fullerton; Northern Illinois University; University of Colorado Denver; University of Hawaiʻi at Mānoa; California Academy of Sciences
- Thesis: Systematics and zoogeography of Myripristis Cuvier (Pisces: Holocentridae) (1966)

David Wayne Greenfield (born April 21, 1940, in Carmel-by-the-Sea, California) is an American ichthyologist, marine biologist, ecologist, zoogeographer, and university professor.

== Biography ==
Greenfield earned his Bachelor of Arts degree in 1962 from Humboldt State University in Arcata, California. In 1966, he received his Ph.D. in fisheries science from the University of Washington in Seattle with the dissertation Systematics and zoogeography of Myripristis Cuvier (Pisces: Holocentridae).

From 1966 to 1970 he was a research associate at the Field Museum of Natural History in Chicago and an assistant professor at California State University, Fullerton. In 1971 he married Teresa Arámbula Greenfield, who later became professor of women’s studies and education at the University of Hawaiʻi at Mānoa (1991–2000); the couple has one child.

From 1970 to 1977 he was associate professor, and from 1977 to 1984 full professor of biological sciences at Northern Illinois University in DeKalb, Illinois. From 1984 to 1987 he was professor of biology at the University of Colorado Denver, and from 1987 to 2003 professor of zoology at the University of Hawaiʻi at Mānoa. Beginning in 1995 he also served as dean of the graduate division at the University of Hawaiʻi at Mānoa. He retired as professor emeritus in 2003 but continues as a research associate at the California Academy of Sciences.

Greenfield’s research focuses on the systematics of coral reef fishes, the zoogeography of marine and freshwater fishes, and the systematics of fishes of Belize and Fiji. Between 1972 and 1981 he conducted coral reef biology studies at the Tropical Studies Center in Belize.

He has published over 150 scientific papers and described 137 fish species, including Poecilia teresae (Poeciliidae) and Eviota teresae (Gobiidae), both dedicated to his wife. His book Fishes of the continental waters of Belize was published in 1997.

== Eponymy ==
Several fish species have been named in his honor, including:

- Acanthemblemaria greenfieldi (Smith-Vaniz & Palacio, 1974)
- Dermatopsis greenfieldi (Møller & Schwarzhans, 2006)
- Microbrotula greenfieldi (Anderson, 2007)
- Myripristis greenfieldi (Randall & Yamakawa, 1996)
- Starksia greenfieldi (Baldwin & Castillo, 2011)

Additionally, Sanopus greenfieldorum (Collette, 1983) was named after both him and his wife.

== Species described by David W. Greenfield ==
Greenfield is the author or co-author of the scientific descriptions of numerous fish taxa, including more than 100 species across several families such as Holocentridae, Gobiidae, Apogonidae, and others.

- Allenbatrachus (Greenfield, 1997)
- Allenbatrachus meridionalis (Greenfield & Smith, 2004)
- Anchoa belizensis (Thomerson & Greenfield, 1975)
- Anchovia landivarensis (Greenfield & Greenfield, 1975)
- Apogon indicus (Greenfield, 2001)
- Apogon kautamea (Greenfield & Randall, 2004)
- Apogon marquesensis (Greenfield, 2001)
- Apogon rubrifuscus (Greenfield & Randall, 2004)
- Apogon seminigracaudus (Greenfield, 2007)
- Apogon susanae (Greenfield, 2001)
- Austrobatrachus iselesele (Greenfield, 2012)
- Azurina meridiana (Greenfield & Woods, 1980)
- Barchatus indicus (Greenfield, 2014)
- Bifax (Greenfield, Mee & Randall, 1994)
- Bifax lacinia (Greenfield, Mee & Randall, 1994)
- Brotula flaviviridis (Greenfield, 2005)
- Cabillus caudimacula (Greenfield & Randall, 2004)
- Chromis alta (Greenfield & Woods, 1980)
- Chromis limbaughi (Greenfield & Woods, 1980)
- Chromis randalli (Greenfield & Hensley, 1970)
- Chrysiptera rapanui (Greenfield & Hensley, 1970)
- Colletteichthys (Greenfield, 2006)
- Colletteichthys flavipinnis (Greenfield, Bineesh & Akhilesh, 2012)
- Colletteichthys occidentalis (Greenfield, 2012)
- Cryptocentrus nanus (Greenfield & Allen, 2018)
- Emblemaria hyltoni (Johnson & Greenfield, 1976)
- Emblemariopsis pricei (Greenfield, 1975)
- Eviota algida (Greenfield & Algida, 2014)
- Eviota amphipora (Greenfield & Erdmann, 2020)
- Eviota ancora (Greenfield & Suzuki, 2011)
- Eviota angustifascia (Greenfield & Erdmann, 2020)
- Eviota aquila (Greenfield & Jewett, 2014)
- Eviota asymbasia (Greenfield & Jewett, 2016)
- Eviota atriventris (Greenfield & Suzuki, 2012)
- Eviota bilunula (Greenfield & Suzuki, 2016)
- Eviota bipunctata (Greenfield & Jewett, 2016)
- Eviota brahmi (Greenfield & Tornabene, 2014)
- Eviota dalyi (Greenfield & Gordon, 2019)
- Eviota dorsogilva (Greenfield & Randall, 2011)
- Eviota dorsopurpurea (Greenfield & Randall, 2011)
- Eviota epistigmata (Greenfield & Jewett, 2014)
- Eviota erdmanni (Tornabene & Greenfield, 2016)
- Eviota eyreae (Greenfield & Randall, 2016)
- Eviota fallax (Greenfield & Allen, 2012)
- Eviota filamentosa (Suzuki & Greenfield, 2014)
- Eviota flaviarma (Greenfield & Erdmann, 2021)
- Eviota flavipinnata (Suzuki, Greenfield & Motomura, 2015)
- Eviota flebilis (Greenfield, Suzuki & Shibukawa, 2014)
- Eviota fluctiphila (Greenfield, Erdmann & Mambrasar, 2022)
- Eviota geminata (Greenfield & Bogorodsky, 2014)
- Eviota gunawanae (Greenfield, Tornabene & Erdmann, 2019)
- Eviota imitata (Greenfield, Tornabene & Erdmann, 2017)
- Eviota jewettae (Greenfield & Winterbottom, 2012)
- Eviota karaspila (Greenfield & Randall, 2010)
- Eviota lateritea (Greenfield & Winterbottom, 2016)
- Eviota lentiginosa (Greenfield & Randall, 2017)
- Eviota longirostris (Tornabene, Greenfield & Erdmann, 2021)
- Eviota maculibotella (Greenfield & Winterbottom, 2016)
- Eviota maculosa (Greenfield, Tornabene & Erdmann, 2018)
- Eviota marerubrum (Tornabene, Greenfield & Erdmann, 2021)
- Eviota marteynae (Greenfield & Erdmann, 2020)
- Eviota melanosphena (Greenfield & Jewett, 2016)
- Eviota mimica (Greenfield & Randall, 2016)
- Eviota minuta (Greenfield & Jewett, 2014)
- Eviota nigramembrana (Greenfield & Suzuki, 2013)
- Eviota nigrispina (Greenfield & Suzuki, 2010)
- Eviota notata (Greenfield & Jewett, 2012)
- Eviota occasa (Greenfield, Winterbottom & Suzuki, 2014)
- Eviota oculineata (Tornabene, Greenfield & Erdmann, 2021)
- Eviota oculopiperita (Greenfield & Bogorodsky, 2014)
- Eviota pictifacies (Greenfield & Erdmann, 2017)
- Eviota pinocchioi (Greenfield & Winterbottom, 2012)
- Eviota piperata (Greenfield & Winterbottom, 2014)
- Eviota pseudaprica (Winterbottom & Greenfield, 2020)
- Eviota pseudozebrina (Tornabene, Greenfield & Erdmann, 2021)
- Eviota randalli (Greenfield, 2009)
- Eviota richardi (Greenfield & Randall, 2016)
- Eviota rubra (Greenfield & Randall, 1999)
- Eviota rubriceps (Greenfield & Jewett, 2011)
- Eviota rubriguttata (Greenfield & Suzuki, 2011)
- Eviota rubrimaculata (Suzuki, Greenfield & Motomura, 2015)
- Eviota rubrisparsa (Greenfield & Randall, 2010)
- Eviota santanai (Greenfield & Erdmann, 2013)
- Eviota shibukawai (Suzuki & Greenfield, 2014)
- Eviota shimadai (Greenfield & Randall, 2010)
- Eviota singula (Greenfield & Winterbottom, 2016)
- Eviota sodwanaensis (Greenfield & Winterbottom, 2016)
- Eviota specca (Greenfield, Suzuki & Shibukawa, 2014)
- Eviota springeri (Greenfield & Jewett, 2012)
- Eviota susanae (Greenfield & Randall, 1999)
- Eviota taeiae (Erdmann, Greenfield & Tornabene, 2023)
- Eviota teresae (Greenfield & Randall, 2016)
- Eviota tetha (Greenfield & Erdmann, 2014)
- Eviota thamani (Greenfield & Randall, 2016)
- Eviota tigrina (Greenfield & Randall, 2008)
- Eviota toshiyuki (Greenfield & Randall, 2010)
- Eviota winterbottomi (Greenfield & Randall, 2010)
- Gambusia xanthosoma (Greenfield, 1983)
- Gnatholepis gymnocara (Randall & Greenfield, 2001)
- Gnatholepis pascuensis (Randall & Greenfield, 2001)
- Gorgasia thamani (Greenfield & Niesz, 2004)
- Halophryne hutchinsi (Greenfield, 1998)
- Halophryninae (Greenfield, Winterbottom & Collette, 2008)
- Lythrypnus brasiliensis (Greenfield, 1988)
- Myersina balteata (Greenfield & Randall, 2018)
- Myripristis aulacodes (Randall & Greenfield, 1996)
- Myripristis formosa (Randall & Greenfield, 1996)
- Myripristis gildi (Greenfield, 1965)
- Myripristis randalli (Greenfield, 1974)
- Myripristis robusta (Randall & Greenfield, 1996)
- Myripristis tiki (Greenfield, 1974)
- Myripristis woodsi (Greenfield, 1974)
- Ostichthys convexus (Greenfield, Randall & Psomadakis, 2017)
- Ostichthys daniela (Greenfield, Randall & Psomadakis, 2017)
- Paedovaricus imswe (Greenfield, 1981)
- Palatogobius grandoculus (Greenfield, 2002)
- Perulibatrachus aquilonarius (Greenfield, 2005)
- Perulibatrachus kilburni (Greenfield, 1996)
- Pleurosicya larsonae (Greenfield & Randall, 2004)
- Poecilia teresae (Greenfield, 1990)
- Priolepis dawsoni (Greenfield, 1989)
- Psilotris boehlkei (Greenfield, 1993)
- Psilotris kaufmani (Greenfield, Findley & Johnson, 1993)
- Scorpaena lacrimata (Randall & Greenfield, 2004)
- Scorpaenodes quadrispinosus (Greenfield & Matsuura, 2002)
- Scorpaenopsis eschmeyeri (Randall & Greenfield, 2004)
- Starksia occidentalis (Greenfield, 1979)
- Starksia variabilis (Greenfield, 1979)
- Sueviota minersorum (Greenfield, Erdmann & Utama, 2019)
- Sueviota pyrios (Greenfield & Randall, 2017)
- Tomiyamichthys reticulatus (Greenfield, 2017)
- Trachelyichthys exilis (Greenfield & Glodek, 1977)
- Vanderhorstia bella (Greenfield & Longenecker, 2005)
- Vladichthys (Greenfield, 2006)
- Vladichthys gloverensis (Greenfield & Greenfield, 1973)
- Zoramia flebila (Greenfield, Langston & Randall, 2005)
- Zoramia viridiventer (Greenfield, Langston & Randall, 2005)

== Selected works ==
- Greenfield, D.W. (1997). Fishes of the continental waters of Belize.
- Over 150 peer-reviewed scientific articles on ichthyology, zoogeography, and coral reef ecology.
