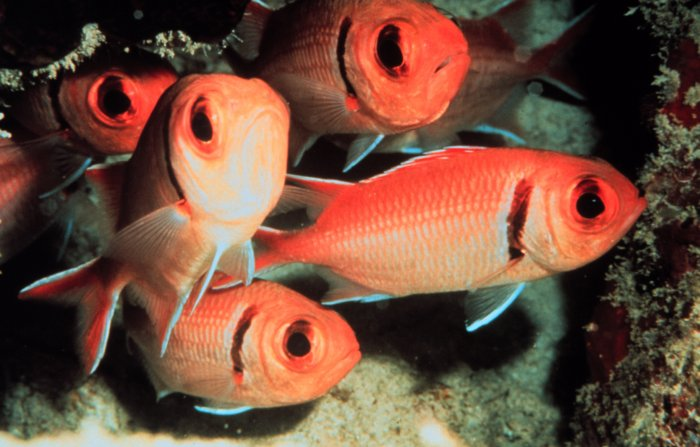
- Myripristis jacobus

Scientific classification
- Kingdom: Animalia
- Phylum: Chordata
- Class: Actinopterygii
- Order: Beryciformes
- Family: Holocentridae
- Subfamily: Myripristinae; J. Richardson, 1846

Genera
- Corniger; Myripristis; Ostichthys; Plectrypops; Pristilepis

= Myripristinae =

Myripristinae Temporal range: Middle Eocene–present

Subfamily of fishes

Myripristinae is a subfamily of the ray-finned fish family Holocentridae. They are typically known as soldierfish.

Fossil members of the group include Africentrum from Malta and Holocentrites from Florida.
