= Whitelined toadfish =

Conservation status
- Vulnerable (IUCN 3.1)

Scientific classification
- Kingdom: Animalia
- Phylum: Chordata
- Class: Actinopterygii
- Order: Batrachoidiformes
- Family: Batrachoididae
- Genus: Sanopus
- Species: S. greenfieldorum

Binomial name
- Sanopus greenfieldorum Collette, 1983

Species of fish

The whitelined toadfish (Sanopus greenfieldorum) is a species of marine ray-finned fish belonging to the family Batrachoididae, the toadfishes. This fish is endemic to the waters off Belize.

== Taxonomy ==
The whitelined toadfish was first formally described in 1983 by the American ichthyologist Bruce Baden Collette with its type locality given as from a depth of 1 m (3 ft 3 in) 3.2 km (2.0 mi) south of Carrie Bow Cay, Belize. This species is classified within the genus Sanopus, which was proposed in 1928 by J. L. B. Smith with Opsanus barbatus designated as its type species. Sanopus is classified within the subfamily Batrachoidinae of the family Batrachoididae, the only family in the order Batrachoidiformes.

== Etymology ==
The whitelined toadfish is a species in the genus Sanopus, this name was not explained by Smith but is an anagram of Opsanus, the genus that the type species, S. barbatus, was classified in at the time Smith proposed the new genus. The specific name honours both David W. Greenfield and Teresa Arambula Greenfield, the collectors of the type and sent it to Collette as they suspected that it was an undescribed species.

== Description ==
The whitelined toadfish types had a standard length which ranged between 27 cm (11 in) and 28 cm (11 in). This species has a dark body with clearly visible white markings, and the head is marked with numerous white lines. The dorsal fin is supported by 3 spines and between 30 and 32 soft rays while the anal fin has 24 or 25 soft rays.

== Distribution and habitat ==
The whitelined toadfish is only known to occur in the Gulf of Honduras off Belize where it has been recorded between Carrie Bow Cay and South Water Cay. It is found at depths between 5 and 30 m (16 and 98 ft) in depression in the sand beneath corals.

== Biology ==
The whitelined toadfish is a predator which feeds on crabs, gastropds and smaller fishes. Like other toadfishes, this species is likely to have low levels of larval dispersal because their eggs are demersal and there is no pelagic larval phase. This type lo life history probably results in low genetic interchange between toadfish populations.
