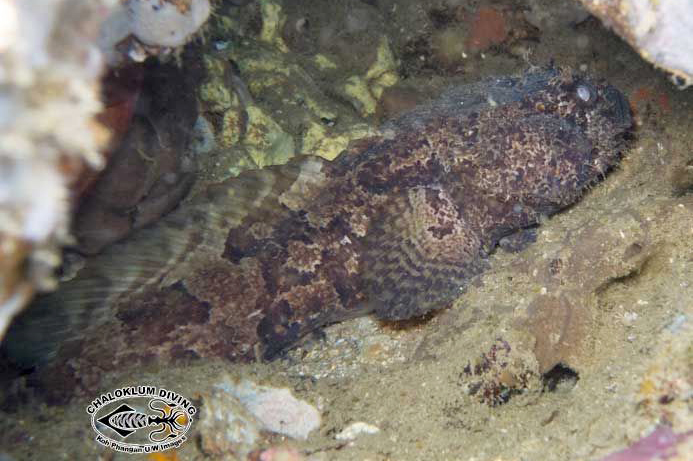

Conservation status
- Vulnerable (IUCN 3.1)

Scientific classification
- Kingdom: Animalia
- Phylum: Chordata
- Class: Actinopterygii
- Order: Batrachoidiformes
- Family: Batrachoididae
- Genus: Batrachomoeus
- Species: B. trispinosus

Binomial name
- Batrachomoeus trispinosus (Günther, 1861)

Synonyms
- Batrachus trispinosus Günther, 1861; Halophryne trispinosus (Günther, 1861); Batrachomoeus broadbenti Ogilby, 1908; Pseudobatrachus eugeneius Fowler, 1937

= Batrachomoeus trispinosus =

Species of fish

Batrachomoeus trispinosus, the three-spined frogfish or Broadbent's frogfish, is a species of Indo-Pacific toadfish, from the largely Old World subfamily, Halophryninae, of the family Batrachoididae. It is the type species of the genus Batrachomoeus. It is said to be the only fish known to cry like a baby and produce complex non-linear calls. Others fish can only make simple linear sounds but human babies and other mammals use non-linear sounds in their calls, in which other animals associate such non-linear sounds with a sense of emotional urgency.

B. trispinosus is a tropical species which can be found in a variety of habitats including intertidal flats near mangroves, estuaries, and reefs down to depths of 68 metres (223 ft). It is distributed in the eastern Indian and western Pacific Oceans from Thailand to the Arafura Sea between northern Australia and New Guinea, it is found in the Mekong Delta. The alternative common name and the synonym Batrachomoeus broadbenti were coined by Ogilby in honour of the Australian explorer and collector of Australian and New Guinea specimens, Kendall Broadbent.
