= Finless eel =

Finless eel is a common name for several fishes and may refer to:

- Apterichtus equatorialis, native to the eastern Pacific ocean
- Apterichtus kendalli, native to the western Atlantic ocean
