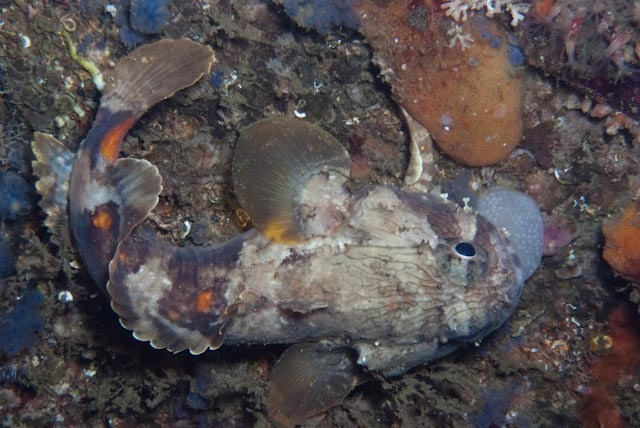

Conservation status
- Least Concern (IUCN 3.1)

Scientific classification
- Kingdom: Animalia
- Phylum: Chordata
- Class: Actinopterygii
- Order: Batrachoidiformes
- Family: Batrachoididae
- Genus: Batrichthys
- Species: B. apiatus

Binomial name
- Batrichthys apiatus (Valenciennes, 1837)

Synonyms
- Batrachus apiatus Valenciennes, 1837; Amphichthys ophiocephalus Smith, 1947; Batrichthys ophiocephalus (Smith, 1947); Gymnobatrachus ophiocephalus (Smith, 1947)

= Batrichthys apiatus =

South African fish species

Batrichthys apiatus, the snakehead toadfish, is a species of fish from the coast of South Africa.

== Description ==
This fish grows up to 10 cm (3.9 in) long and has a somewhat depressed shape. The large, broad head has a few irregularly shaped dark marks and the body and dorsal fin have broad darked-edged brown bars. The large pectoral fins have a few dusky bars. There is a dark line across the eyes, extending onto the gill covers. Small, fleshy tentacles surround the mouth, but these are not always easily visible due to the size of the fish.

== Distribution and habitat ==
This species is endemic to the Atlantic Ocean off the coast of South Africa. It is found between Saldanha Bay and the Transkei. It usually occurs at depths of less than 10 m (33 ft) and is common in rock pools. It commonly hides under rocks and small boulders.
