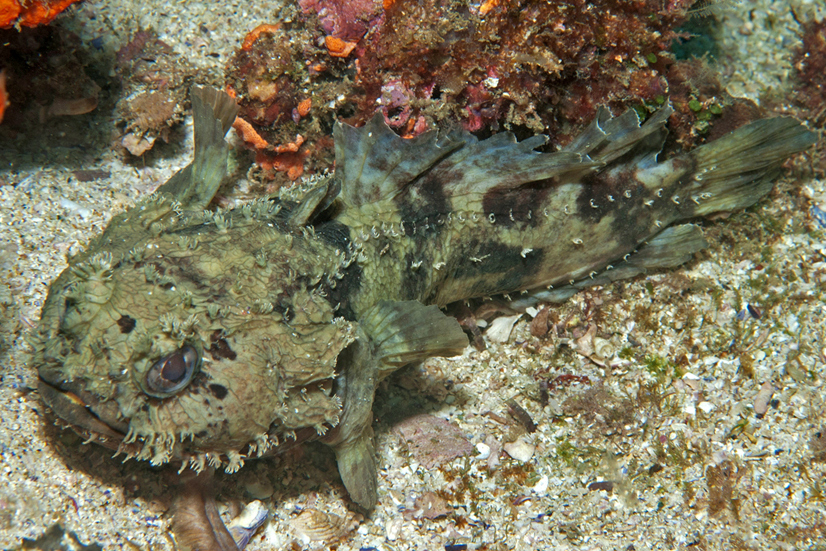
- 'Eastern Frogfish' Batrachomoeus dubius at North Solitary Island, New South Wales

Conservation status
- Least Concern (IUCN 3.1)

Scientific classification
- Kingdom: Animalia
- Phylum: Chordata
- Class: Actinopterygii
- Order: Batrachoidiformes
- Family: Batrachoididae
- Genus: Batrachomoeus
- Species: B. dubius

Binomial name
- Batrachomoeus dubius (White, 1790)

Synonyms
- Lophius dubius White, 1790; Pseudobatrachus dubius (White, 1790); Lophius nigricans Forster, 1794; Pseudobatrachus striatus Castelnau, 1875; Thalassophryne coeca De Vis, 1884; Pelophiletor caloundrae Ogilby, 1907; Batrachomoeus minor Ogilby, 1908

= Batrachomoeus dubius =

Species of fish

The eastern frogfish (Batrachomoeus dubius) is a bottom-dwelling fish endemic to coastal eastern Australia, from Fraser Island, Queensland to Kiama, New South Wales. It is an ambush predator with a large expandable stomach, capable of swallowing crustaceans, molluscs and other fishes whole.

== Habitat ==
The fish is found at depths of 1–150 m along the continental shelf but also estuaries and inshore reefs. Rarely seen in the open, they shelter on rocky reefs and among seaweed or under rocks and in underwater caves.

== Morphology ==
The eastern frogfish has a flattened head with a wide mouth surrounded by a distinct fleshy 'beard'. Its colour varies from mottled brown to pale grey or bluish-grey, with two broad bands and scattered splotches along the body. Juveniles are paler with broad bands. They reach a maximum length of 35 cm.
