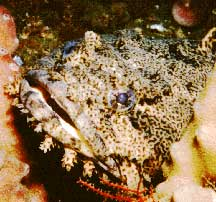

Conservation status
- Least Concern (IUCN 3.1)

Scientific classification
- Kingdom: Animalia
- Phylum: Chordata
- Class: Actinopterygii
- Division: Teleostei
- Order: Batrachoidiformes
- Family: Batrachoididae
- Genus: Opsanus
- Species: O. tau

Binomial name
- Opsanus tau (Linnaeus, 1766)

Synonyms
- Gadus tau Linnaeus, 1766; Opsanus cerapalus Rafinesque, 1818

= Oyster toadfish =

Species of fish

The oyster toadfish (Opsanus tau), also known as the oyster toad, ugly toad, oyster cracker, oyster catcher, and bar dog, is a Northwest Atlantic species of fish of the family Batrachoididae. The maximum length of this toadfish is 43.2 cm (17 in), but they infrequently surpass 38 cm (15 in). The record size for this species is 19.2 inches (48.76 cm). They are generally yellowish with a pattern of brown oblique bars. The species can live in poor conditions and needs little food to live. They can be found near the shore from Maine to Florida.

In 1998, NASA sent the oyster toadfish into space to investigate the effects of microgravity on the development of otolithic organs. The study found little difference between terrestrial development and those in space.

== Life history ==
=== Spawning and life cycle ===
Oyster toadfish spawn in coastal estuaries from May through August, with some variation between latitudes. Males excavate nests under rocks or other debris and begin making advertisement calls, also known as boatwhistles and foghorns. Females are attracted to these calls. Females choose a mate, enter the nest, attach eggs to the underside of the structure, then leave. Females provide no parental care. Males fertilize the eggs, then defend and clean the nest while embryos develop. Toadfish embryos are large and, as a result, have been studied for over a century.

After about 4 weeks the eggs hatch. At first, the young toadfish stay attached to the yolk. When the yolk has been absorbed for energy, the young toadfish learn to swim. Even when the young have started to swim, the adult still protects its young.

Juveniles reach sexual maturity at 2–7 years and have a lifespan of 8 years. Little is known about individual range or whether toadfish exhibit natal philopatry.

=== Predators and prey ===
Toadfish are ambush predators during the day, when they remain buried or hidden under structure and lunge for passing prey. At night they forage. Toadfish eat benthic invertebrates (e.g. polychaetes) and xanthid crabs. Toadfish have sharp teeth and powerful jaws.

Oyster toadfish are apex predators on oyster reefs. Nonetheless, evidence exists that they are prey for birds (e.g. cormorants). A related species, Opsanus beta, is prey for dolphins. Research has demonstrated that toadfish will call less when dolphin sounds are played from a nearby speaker. For protection, toadfish have a spine in the first ray of the dorsal fin. They can bury themselves up to their eyeballs in sand, and might be capable of camouflage.

== Physiology ==
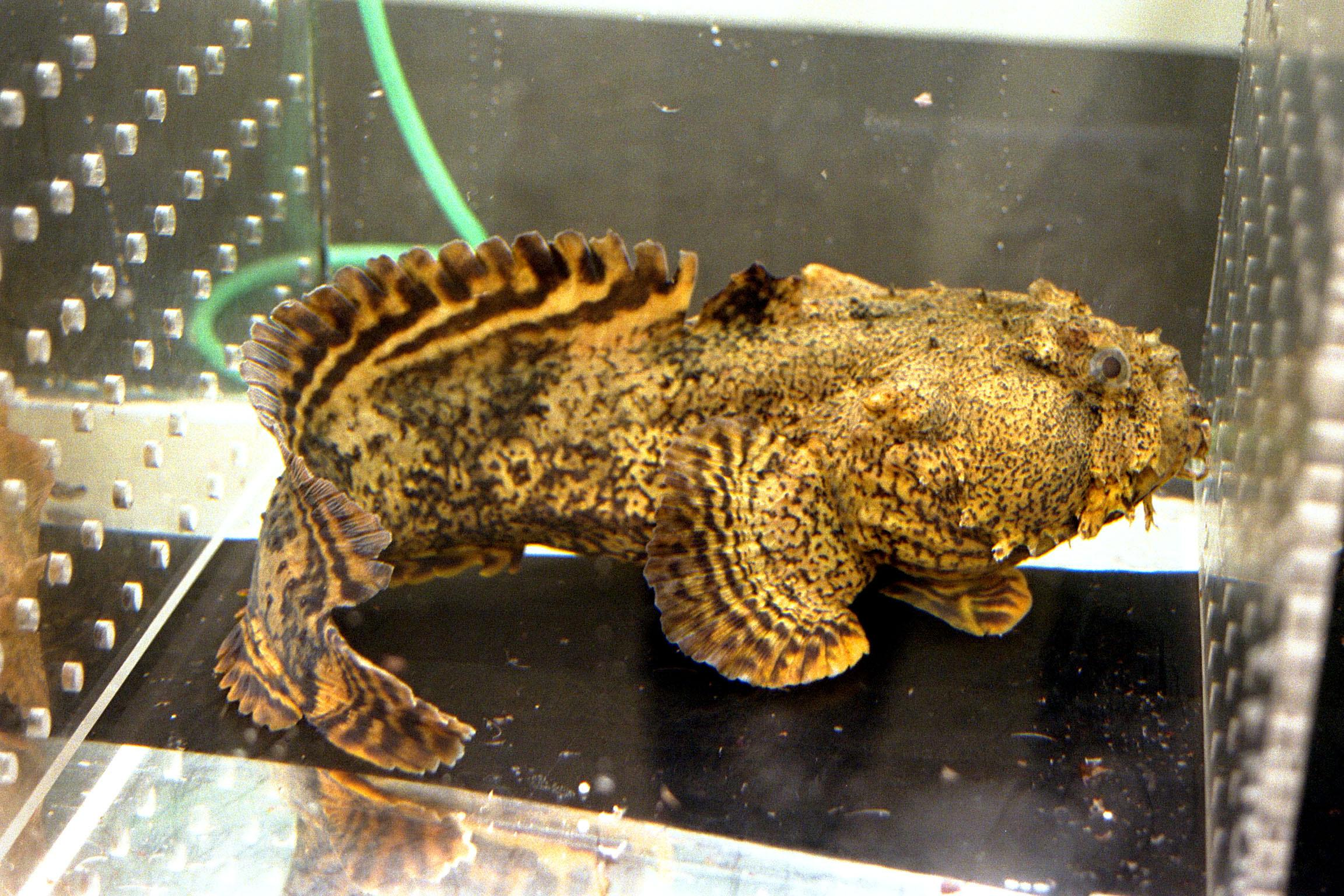
Oyster toadfish

Like many bony fish oyster toadfish have a swim bladder that is used to maintain buoyancy. Like some vocalizing fish, the swim bladder is also used to make sounds. Oyster toadfish males use their swimbladders to make advertisement calls. The fast-twitch swimbladder muscles of toadfish can contract as much as 300 times per second, more quickly than fast-twitch muscles in most vertebrates.

== Model for hearing and behavior ==
Toadfish are easy to observe and collect because they spawn in shallow water. Also, male advertisement calls are easy to detect and are critical for the animal's reproductive success. For these reasons, toadfish have been widely studied in research that examines mating behavior, hearing sensitivity and the impacts of anthropogenic noise.

== Cuisine ==
Oyster toadfish are hard to fillet due to their bony bodies. The meat of the oyster toadfish is flaky and is described as having a sweet flavor, similar to that of blowfish.
