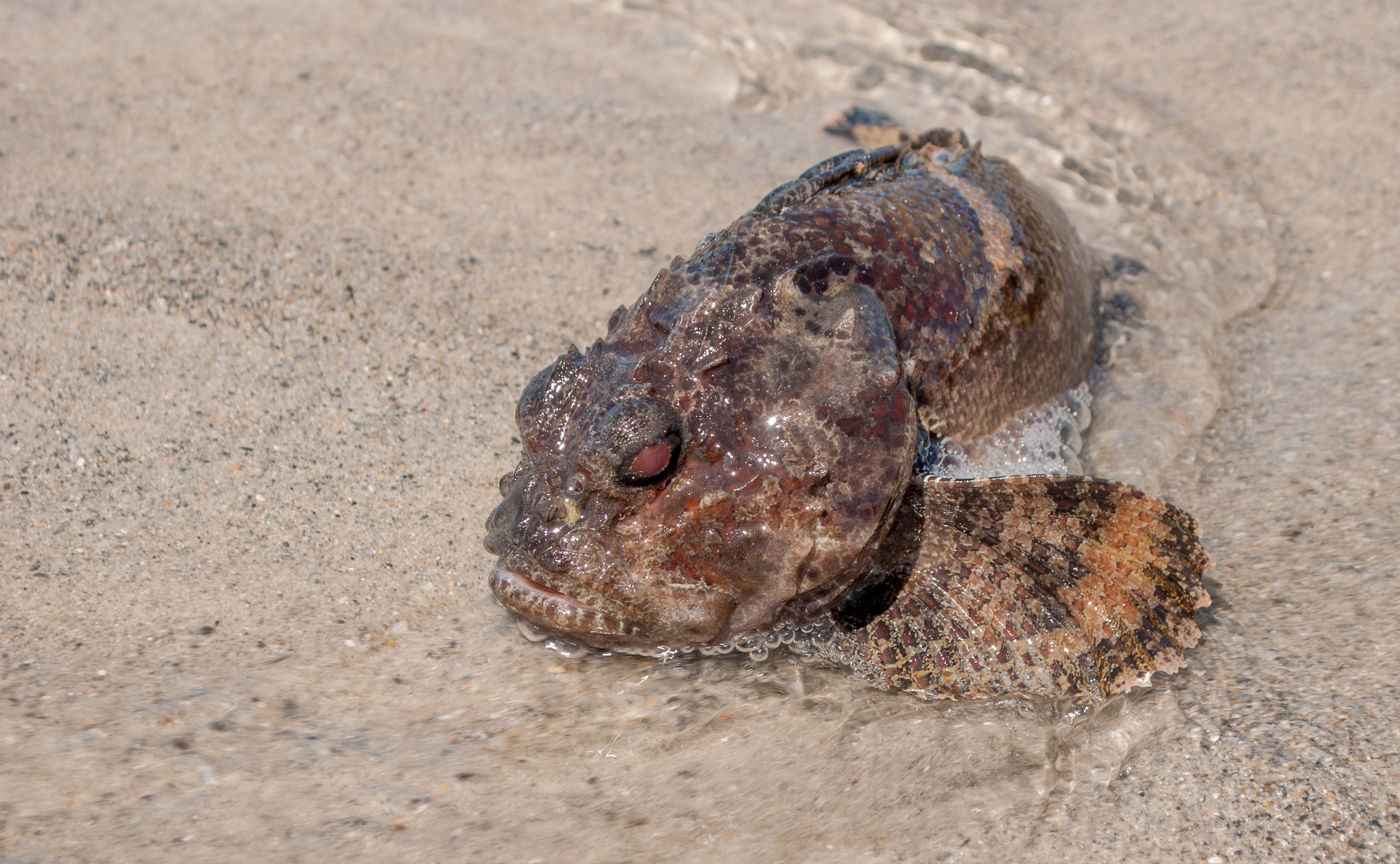

Conservation status
- Least Concern (IUCN 3.1)

Scientific classification
- Kingdom: Animalia
- Phylum: Chordata
- Class: Actinopterygii
- Order: Batrachoidiformes
- Family: Batrachoididae
- Genus: Amphichthys
- Species: A. cryptocentrus

Binomial name
- Amphichthys cryptocentrus (Valenciennes, 1837)

Synonyms
- Amphichthys hildebrandi (Breder, 1925); Batrachus cryptocentrus Valenciennes, 1837; Marcgravia cryptocentra (Valenciennes, 1837); Opsanus hildebrandi Breder, 1925

= Bocon toadfish =

Species of fish

The Bocon toadfish (Amphichthys cryptocentrus) is a species of tropical toadfish in the family Batrachoididae found along the Caribbean-Atlantic Coast of Central and South America from Panama to Brazil in the sub-tidal zone. This species grows to a length of 40 cm (16 in). This species is of minor importance to commercial fisheries. It deposits its eggs on the shells of molluscs and on stones. It is one of the few marine species of fish in which the male guards its fry and juveniles. It feed mostly on molluscs and crustaceans. It is associated with coral and rocky reefsand has a depth range of 0–70 metres (0–230 ft) and is normally found on sandy or rocky sea beds, although it will also hide in caves and rock crevices.
