= Cotuero toadfish =

Conservation status
- Least Concern (IUCN 3.1)

Scientific classification
- Kingdom: Animalia
- Phylum: Chordata
- Class: Actinopterygii
- Order: Batrachoidiformes
- Family: Batrachoididae
- Genus: Batrachoides
- Species: B. manglae

Binomial name
- Batrachoides manglae Cervigón, 1964

Species of fish

The cotuero toadfish (Batrachoides manglae) is a species of toadfish found in tropical waters along the Atlantic Coasts of Colombia and Venezuela. This species grows to a length of 30 cm (12 in). It is of minor importance in commercial fisheries.
