= Barchatus cirrhosus =

Conservation status
- Least Concern (IUCN 3.1)

Scientific classification
- Kingdom: Animalia
- Phylum: Chordata
- Class: Actinopterygii
- Order: Batrachoidiformes
- Family: Batrachoididae
- Genus: Barchatus
- Species: B. cirrhosus

Binomial name
- Barchatus cirrhosus (Klunzinger, 1871)

Synonyms
- Batrachus cirrhosus Klunzinger, 1871; Thalassothia cirrhosa (Klunzinger, 1871)

Species of fish

Barchatus cirrhosus is a species of toadfish native to the western Indian Ocean and the Red Sea. This species grows to a length of 35 cm (14 in). It is one of the species of toadfishes known to have venomous spines.
