= Reticulated toadfish =

Conservation status
- Endangered (IUCN 3.1)

Scientific classification
- Kingdom: Animalia
- Phylum: Chordata
- Class: Actinopterygii
- Order: Batrachoidiformes
- Family: Batrachoididae
- Genus: Sanopus
- Species: S. reticulatus

Binomial name
- Sanopus reticulatus Collette, 1983

Species of fish

The reticulated toadfish (Sanopus reticulatus) is a species of fish in the family Batrachoididae endemic to Yucatan.
