= Frogfish (disambiguation) =

The frogfish is a family of anglerfish, Antennariidae, in the order Lophiiformes.

Frogfish may also refer to:

- Australian frogfish, a ray-finned fish in the order Batrachoidiformes, an ambush predator
- Any fish of the genus Lophius
