= Perulibatrachus =

Scientific classification
- Kingdom: Animalia
- Phylum: Chordata
- Class: Actinopterygii
- Order: Batrachoidiformes
- Family: Batrachoididae
- Subfamily: Halophryninae
- Genus: Perulibatrachus; C. Roux & Whitley, 1972

Type species
- Batrachus elminensis Bleeker, 1863

Genus of fishes

Perulibatrachus is a genus of toadfishes known from the Indian and Atlantic Oceans.

== Species ==
There are currently four recognized species in this genus:

- Perulibatrachus aquilonarius D. W. Greenfield, 2005
- Perulibatrachus elminensis (Bleeker, 1863) (Guinean toadfish)
- Perulibatrachus kilburni D. W. Greenfield, 1996
- Perulibatrachus rossignoli (C. Roux, 1957) (Rossignol's toadfish)
