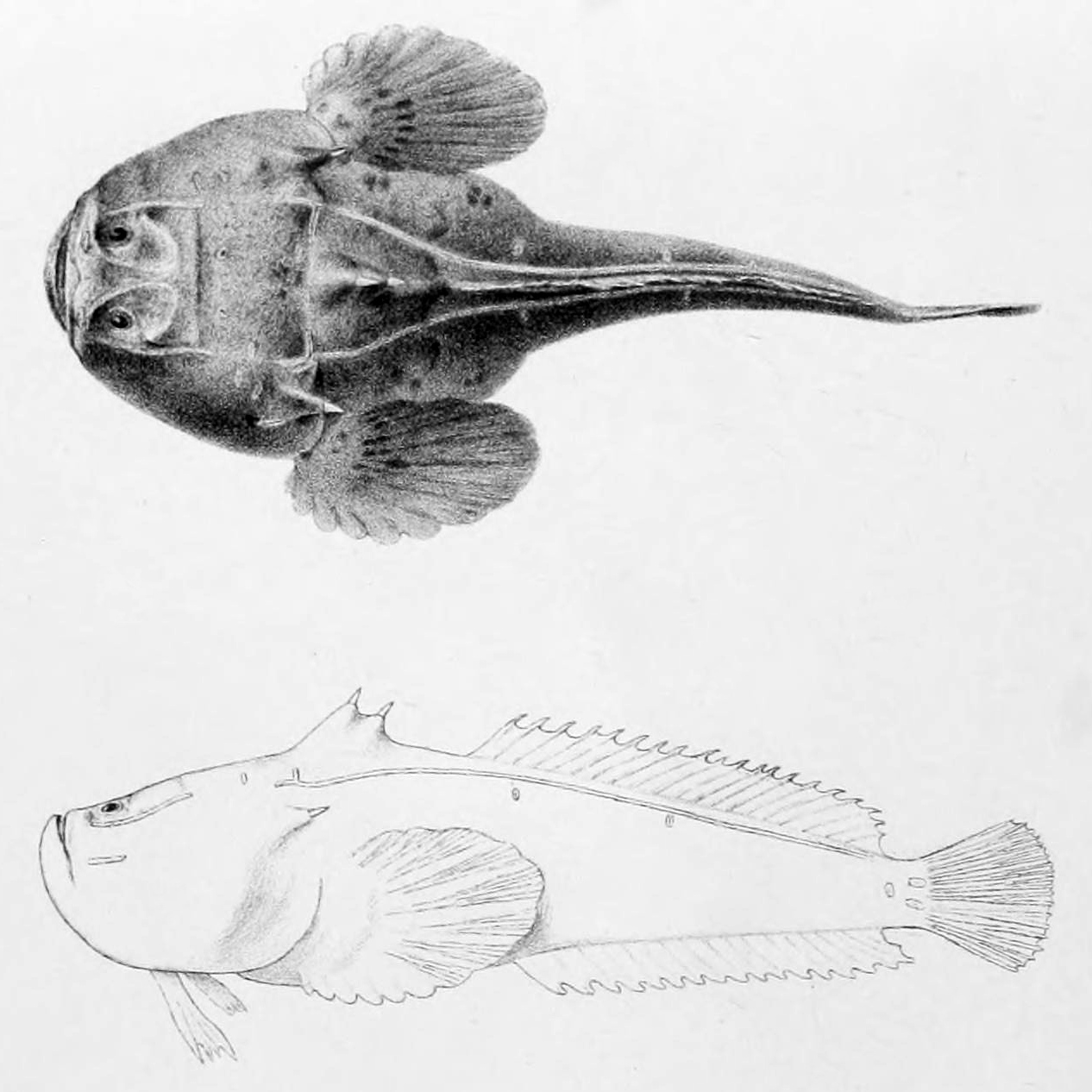

Conservation status
- Least Concern (IUCN 3.1)

Scientific classification
- Kingdom: Animalia
- Phylum: Chordata
- Class: Actinopterygii
- Order: Batrachoidiformes
- Family: Batrachoididae
- Genus: Thalassophryne
- Species: T. maculosa

Binomial name
- Thalassophryne maculosa Günther, 1861

Synonyms
- Batrachus uranoscopus Guichenot, 1866; Thalassophryne wehekindi Fowler, 1931

= Thalassophryne maculosa =

Species of fish

Thalassophryne maculosa, the Cano toadfish, is a species of toadfish which is common along the Caribbean coasts of South America from Colombia to Trinidad and Venezuela. It occurs on the sandy bottoms of reef flats, lagoons, and seaward edges of reefs where it sits partially buried in the substrate. It is a venomous species with the venom being delivered through spines and wounds from the spines have been known to cause severe symptoms of pain and illness that may persist for up to a week. A study of the holotype of Batrachus uranoscopus, said to be a freshwater toadfish from Madagascar, in the Muséum national d’Histoire Naturelle in Paris found that it was most probably a misslabelled specimen of Thalassophryne maculosa and that subsequent records of Batrachus uranoscopus were attributable to Allenbatrachus meridionalis, a species found in Madagascar. T. maculosa is the type species of the genus Thalassophryne, the generic name translates from Greek as "sea toad" while the specific name is Latin for "spotted".
