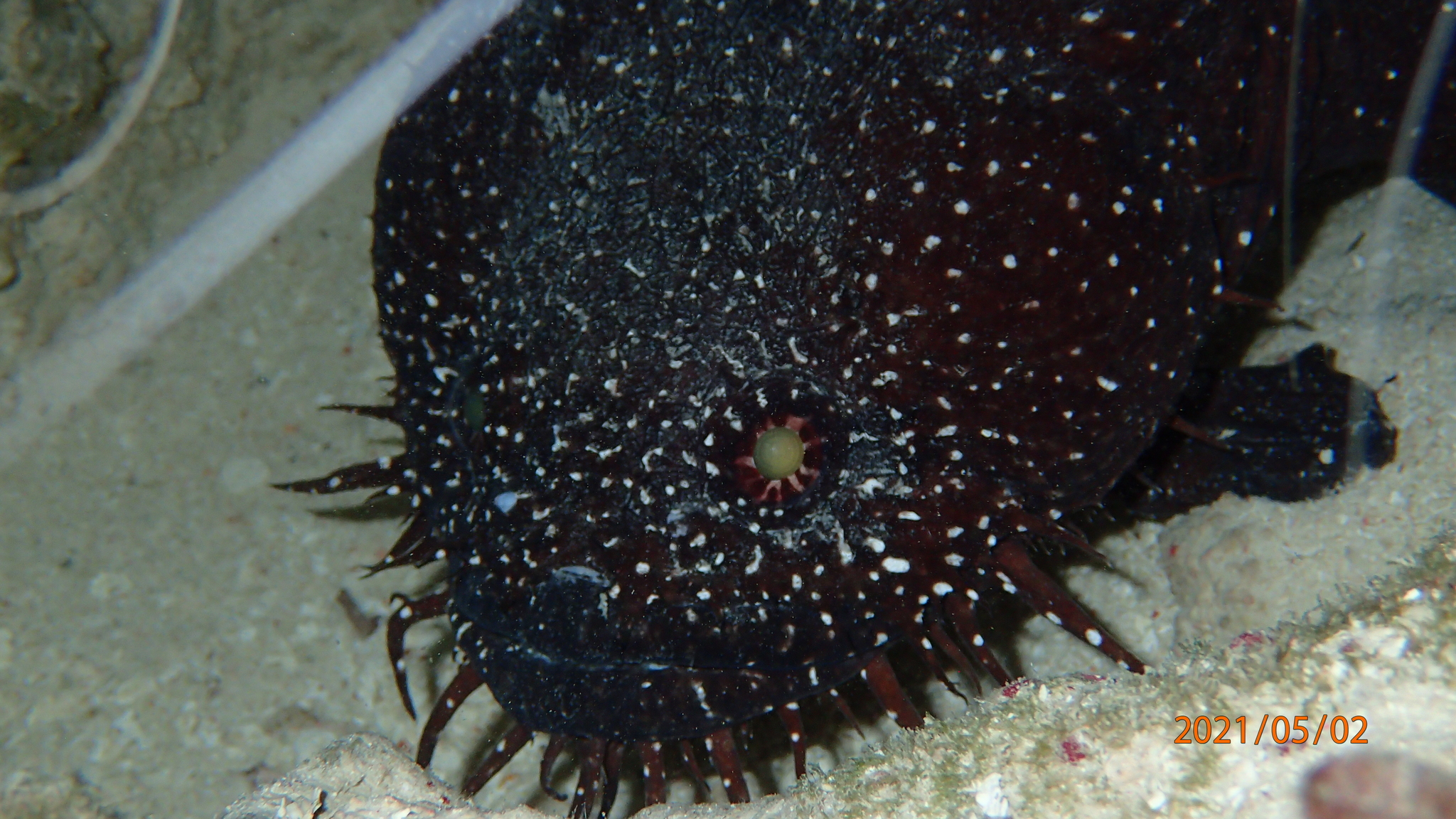

Conservation status
- Vulnerable (IUCN 3.1)

Scientific classification
- Kingdom: Animalia
- Phylum: Chordata
- Class: Actinopterygii
- Order: Batrachoidiformes
- Family: Batrachoididae
- Genus: Sanopus
- Species: S. astrifer

Binomial name
- Sanopus astrifer (C. R. Robins & Starck, 1965)

= Whitespotted toadfish =

Species of fish

The whitespotted toadfish (Sanopus astrifer) is a species of fish in the family Batrachoididae. It is endemic to Belize.
