= Sharpnose sand eel =

There are two species of eel named sharpnose sand eel:

- Apterichtus flavicaudus
- Ichthyapus acuticeps
