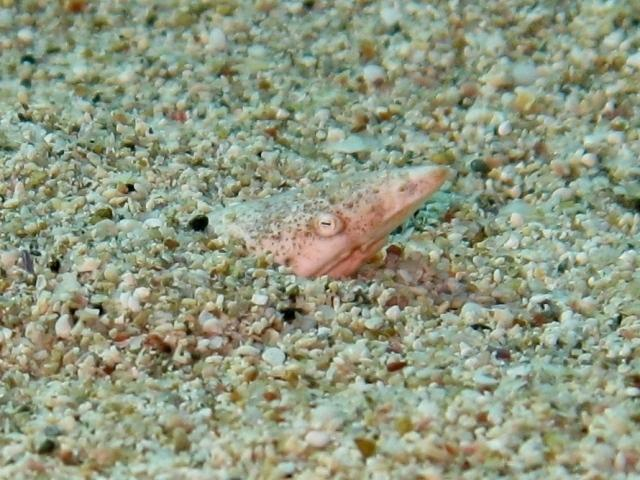
- Apterichtus caecus

Scientific classification
- Kingdom: Animalia
- Phylum: Chordata
- Class: Actinopterygii
- Division: Teleostei
- Order: Anguilliformes
- Family: Ophichthidae
- Subfamily: Ophichthinae
- Genus: Apterichtus; Duméril, 1806

Type species
- Caecilia branderiana Lacépède, 1800

Synonyms
- Branderius Rafinesque, 1815; Ophisurapus Kaup, 1856; Typhlotes Fischer, 1813; Verma Jordan & Evermann, 1896

= Apterichtus =

Genus of fishes

Apterichtus is a genus of fish in the family Ophichthidae (snake eels). Many of its species are called finless eels.

The name literally means "finless fish" in Greek, from apteron ('no-fins' < privative a + pteron) and ichthys ('fish').

== Species ==
There are currently 18 recognized species in this genus:

- Apterichtus anguiformis (W. K. H. Peters, 1877) (Slender finless eel)
- Apterichtus ansp (J. E. Böhlke, 1968) (Academy finless eel)
- Apterichtus australis McCosker & J. E. Randall, 2005
- Apterichtus caecus (Linnaeus, 1758) (European finless eel)
- Apterichtus dunalailai McCosker & Hibino, 2015
- Apterichtus equatorialis (G. S. Myers & Wade, 1941) (Equatorial finless eel)
- Apterichtus flavicaudus (Snyder, 1904)
- Apterichtus gracilis (Kaup, 1856)
- Apterichtus hatookai Hibino, Shibata & Kimura, 2014 (Orange-blotched finless eel)
- Apterichtus jeffwilliamsi McCosker & Hibino, 2015
- Apterichtus kendalli (C. H. Gilbert, 1891) (Western Atlantic finless eel)
- Apterichtus klazingai (M. C. W. Weber, 1913) (Sharp-snout finless eel)
- Apterichtus malabar McCosker & Hibino, 2015
- Apterichtus monodi (C. Roux, 1966)
- Apterichtus moseri (D. S. Jordan & Snyder, 1901)
- Apterichtus mysi McCosker & Hibino, 2015
- Apterichtus nanjilnaduensis
- Apterichtus nariculus McCosker & Hibino, 2015
- Apterichtus orientalis Machida & Ohta, 1994
- Apterichtus succinus Hibino, McCosker & Kimura, 2016
