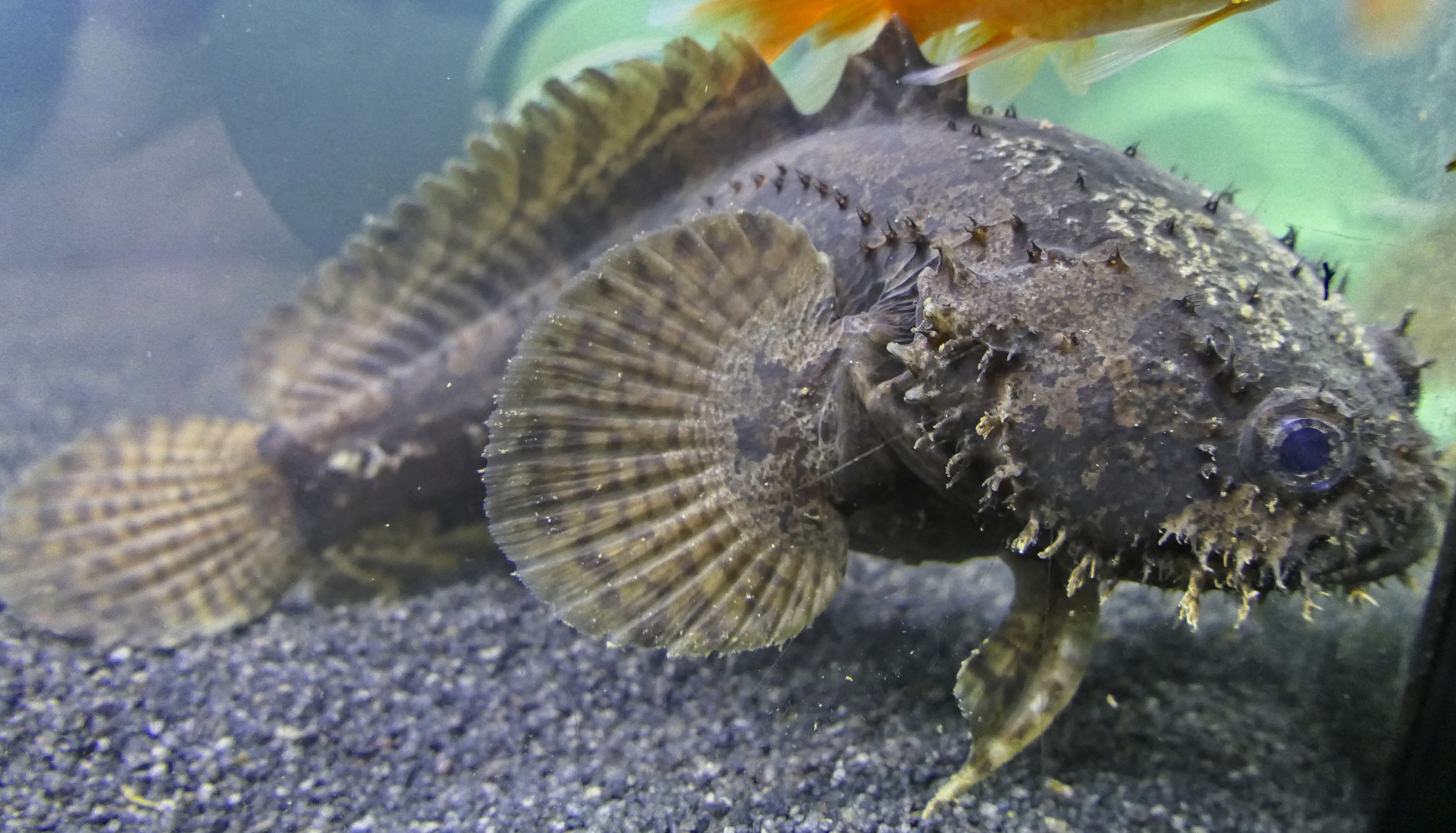

Conservation status
- Least Concern (IUCN 3.1)

Scientific classification
- Kingdom: Animalia
- Phylum: Chordata
- Class: Actinopterygii
- Division: Teleostei
- Order: Batrachoidiformes
- Family: Batrachoididae
- Genus: Allenbatrachus
- Species: A. grunniens

Binomial name
- Allenbatrachus grunniens Linnaeus, 1758

= Allenbatrachus grunniens =

Species of fish

Allenbatrachus grunniens, commonly known as the grunting toadfish, is a species of toadfish found in marine and brackish waters in the Indo Pacific. First described by Carl Linnaeus in 1758, A. grunniens is largely found in coastal waters and estuarine areas, especially over muddy bottoms.

== Description and behavior ==
As ambush predators, Allenbatrachus grunniens rely on camouflage to blend into their surroundings. Their bodies are covered in patches of varying shades of brown and weed-like projections protrude from their faces.

== Biology ==
Allenbatrachus grunniens has a terminal mouth position with an oral cavity lined with canine type teeth. Teeth are found in the maxillary (upper jaw) and mandible (lower jaw) and are divided into mature and immature teeth based on position and histological features.

Allenbatrachus grunniens produces a "boat whistle" mating call 10–12 times a minute for hours on end to attract females to its nest. The fish's mating call is produced by sonic muscles attached to their swim bladders. The contraction of the toadfishes' sonic muscle and the speed of Ca^{2+} transport is the fastest of all vertebrate muscles.

== In the aquarium ==
Allenbatrachus grunniens is occasionally kept in aquariums. A. grunniens is not particularly aggressive and can be kept with other aquarium fish; however, it may struggle to compete with more voracious tank mates for food.

These fish can survive a wide range of water parameters. While they are able to be kept in freshwater aquariums, adding salt is recommended as they are accustomed to brackish environments. They are messy eaters and frequent water changes are recommended in order to maintain water quality.

Care should be taken when handling the animal as it is known to be venomous.
