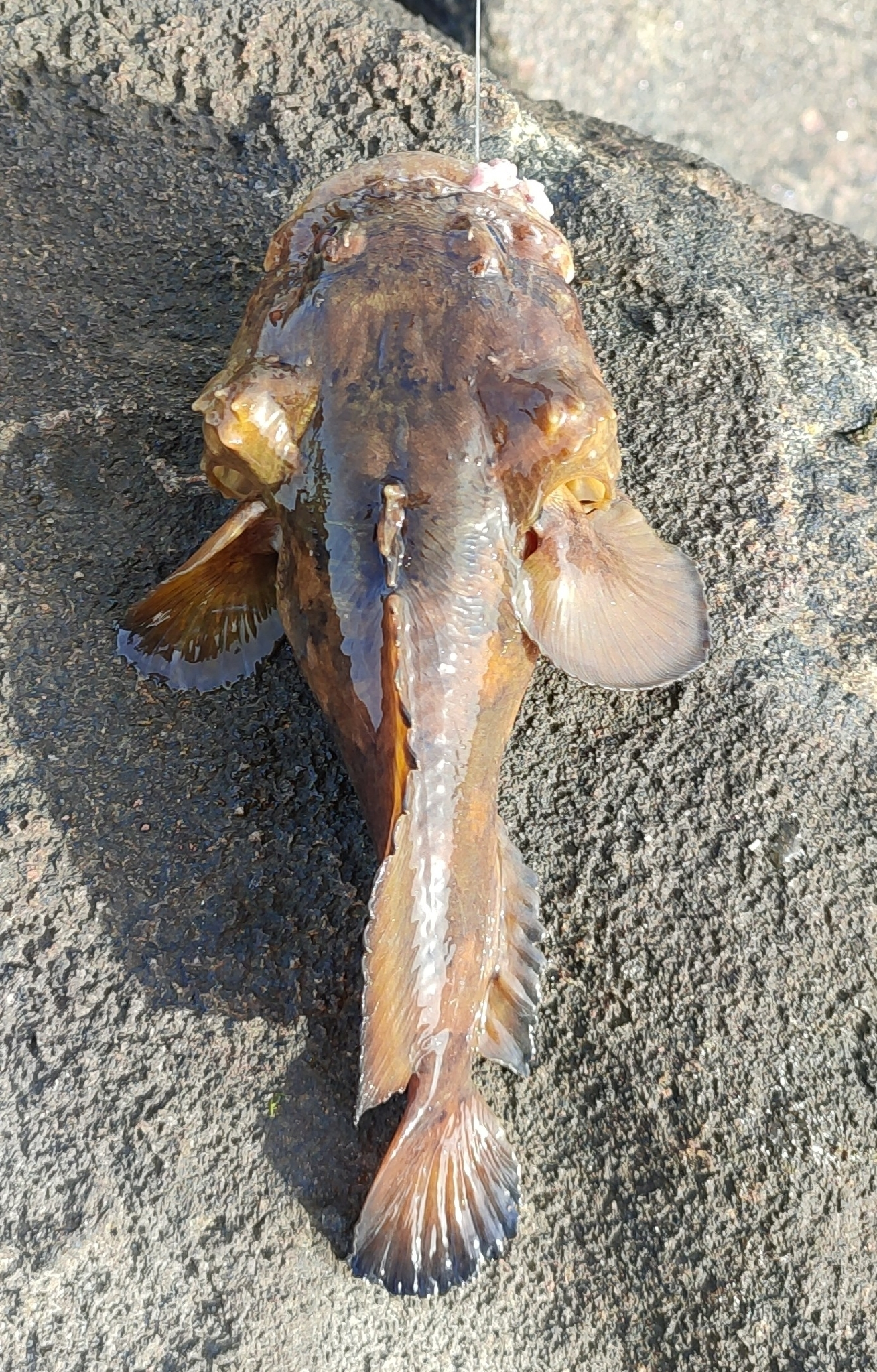

Conservation status
- Least Concern (IUCN 3.1)

Scientific classification
- Kingdom: Animalia
- Phylum: Chordata
- Class: Actinopterygii
- Order: Batrachoidiformes
- Family: Batrachoididae
- Genus: Colletteichthys
- Species: C. dussumieri

Binomial name
- Colletteichthys dussumieri (Valenciennes, 1837)

Synonyms
- Batrachus dussumieri Valenciennes, 1837; Austrobatrachus dussumieri (Valenciennes, 1837)

= Colletteichthys dussumieri =

Species of fish

Colletteichthys dussumieri is a species of toadfish from the family Batrachoididae.

== Etymology ==
The specific name honours the French explorer and trader Jean-Jacques Dussumier (1792-1883) who collected the type specimen.
