= Batrichthys albofasciatus =

Conservation status
- Data Deficient (IUCN 3.1)

Scientific classification
- Kingdom: Animalia
- Phylum: Chordata
- Class: Actinopterygii
- Order: Batrachoidiformes
- Family: Batrachoididae
- Genus: Batrichthys
- Species: B. albofasciatus

Binomial name
- Batrichthys albofasciatus Smith, 1934

Species of fish

Batrichthys albofasciatus, commonly known as the white-ribbed toadfish, is a species of fish in the family Batrachoididae. It is known from just two specimens, both collected from the waters off South Africa.

== Taxonomy and history ==
Batrichthys albofasciatus was described by South African ichthyologist James Leonard Brierley Smith in 1934 as the type species of the newly erected genus Batrichthys. The description was based on a single holotype specimen that washed ashore at Great Fish Point in the Eastern Cape Province after a storm. This species would not be recorded again until 1988, when a second specimen was collected from Hluleka, also in the Eastern Cape Province. No other records are known.

== Description ==
Batrichthys albofasciatus is a scaleless pale brownish fish with a scattering of dark blotches across the body, head, and fins. It possesses three lateral lines, and the rear half of the body is marked by a series of narrow white vertical bars. The dorsal fin has three robust spines lacking venom glands and nineteen rays. The anal fin has fourteen rays but no spines, and each pectoral fin has twenty rays.
