= Apterichtus monodi =

Scientific classification
- Domain: Eukaryota
- Kingdom: Animalia
- Phylum: Chordata
- Class: Actinopterygii
- Order: Anguilliformes
- Family: Ophichthidae
- Genus: Apterichtus
- Species: A. monodi

Binomial name
- Apterichtus monodi (C. Roux, 1966)

Synonyms
- Caecula monodi C. Roux, 1966; Sphagebranchus monodi (C. Roux, 1966); Verma monodi (C. Roux, 1966)

Species of fish

Apterichtus monodi is a species of snake eel native to the eastern Atlantic Ocean where it is found along the African coast from Senegal to Nigeria. It can be found at depths of from 80 to 150 metres (260 to 490 ft) where it digs burrows into sandy or muddy substrates of the continental shelf. This species can reach a length of 49.5 centimetres (19.5 in) TL.
