= Austrobatrachus foedus =

Conservation status
- Data Deficient (IUCN 3.1)

Scientific classification
- Kingdom: Animalia
- Phylum: Chordata
- Class: Actinopterygii
- Order: Batrachoidiformes
- Family: Batrachoididae
- Genus: Austrobatrachus
- Species: A. foedus

Binomial name
- Austrobatrachus foedus (J. L. B. Smith, 1947)

Synonyms
- Pseudobatrachus foedus J.L.B.Smith, 1947

Species of fish

Austrobatrachus foedus, the puzzled toadfish, is a species of toadfish found along the Atlantic Coast of South Africa. This species grows to a length of 27 cm (11 in).
