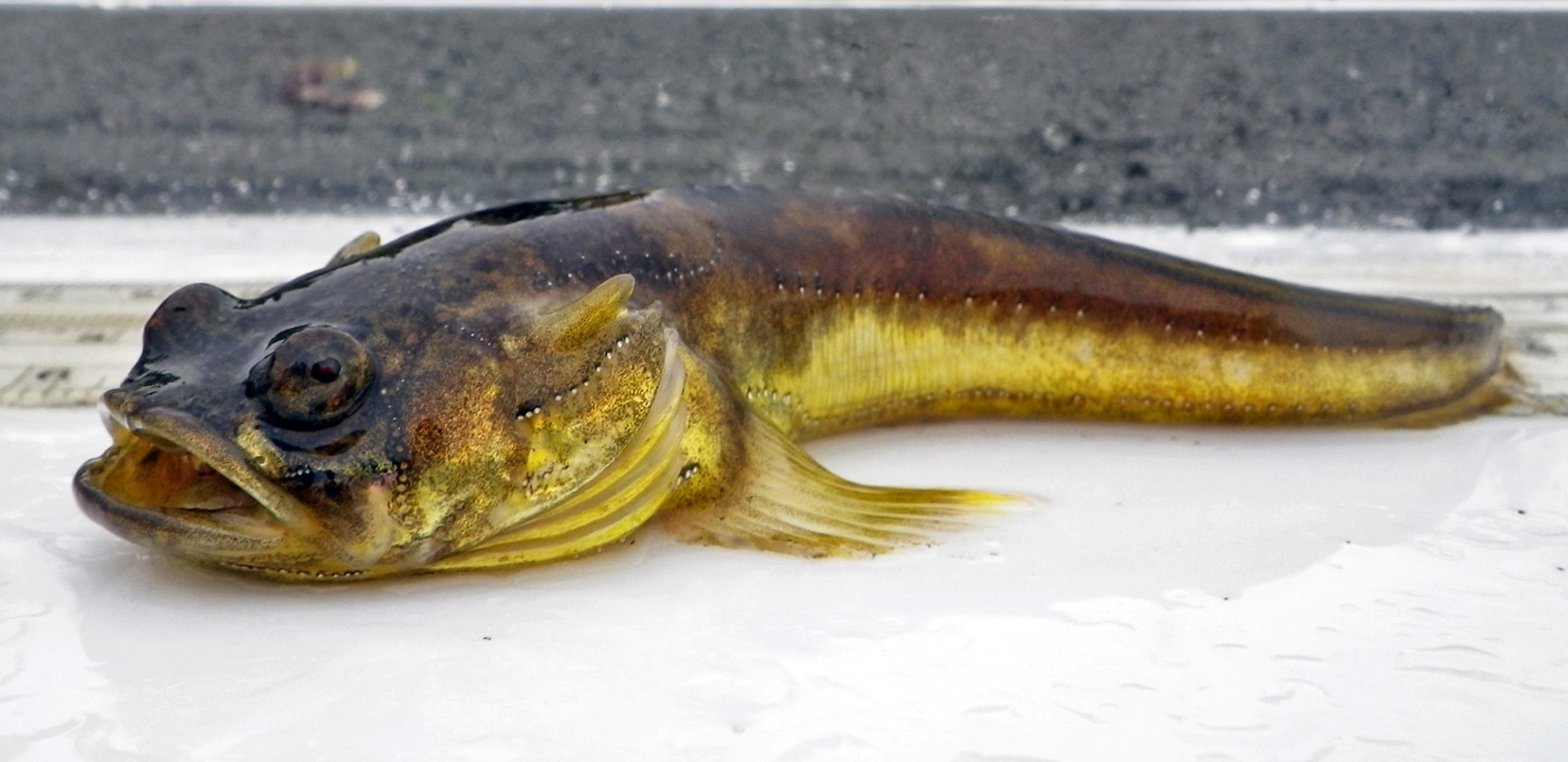
- Plainfin midshipman (Porichthys notatus)

Scientific classification
- Kingdom: Animalia
- Phylum: Chordata
- Class: Actinopterygii
- Order: Batrachoidiformes
- Family: Batrachoididae
- Subfamily: Porichthyinae; Miranda-Ribeiro, 1915

= Porichthyinae =

Subfamily of fishes

Porichthyinae is a subfamily of toadfish in the family Batrachoididae. They are found in the eastern Pacific Ocean and western Atlantic from Canada to Argentina. The species of this subfamily have no venom glands or subopercular spines, they have canine like teeth and two solid spines in the dorsal fin.

== Genera ==
There are two genera in the Porichthyinae:

- Aphos Hubbs & Schultz, 1939
- Porichthys Girard, 1854
