= Potamobatrachus =

Conservation status
- Vulnerable (IUCN 3.1)

Scientific classification
- Kingdom: Animalia
- Phylum: Chordata
- Class: Actinopterygii
- Division: Teleostei
- Order: Batrachoidiformes
- Family: Batrachoididae
- Subfamily: Batrachoidinae
- Genus: Potamobatrachus
- Species: P. trispinosus

Binomial name
- Potamobatrachus trispinosus Collette, 1995

Species of fish

Potamobatrachus trispinosus is a species of toadfish endemic to Brazil where it is found in the Araguaia and Tocantins Rivers. This species grows to a length of 5 cm (2.0 in).
