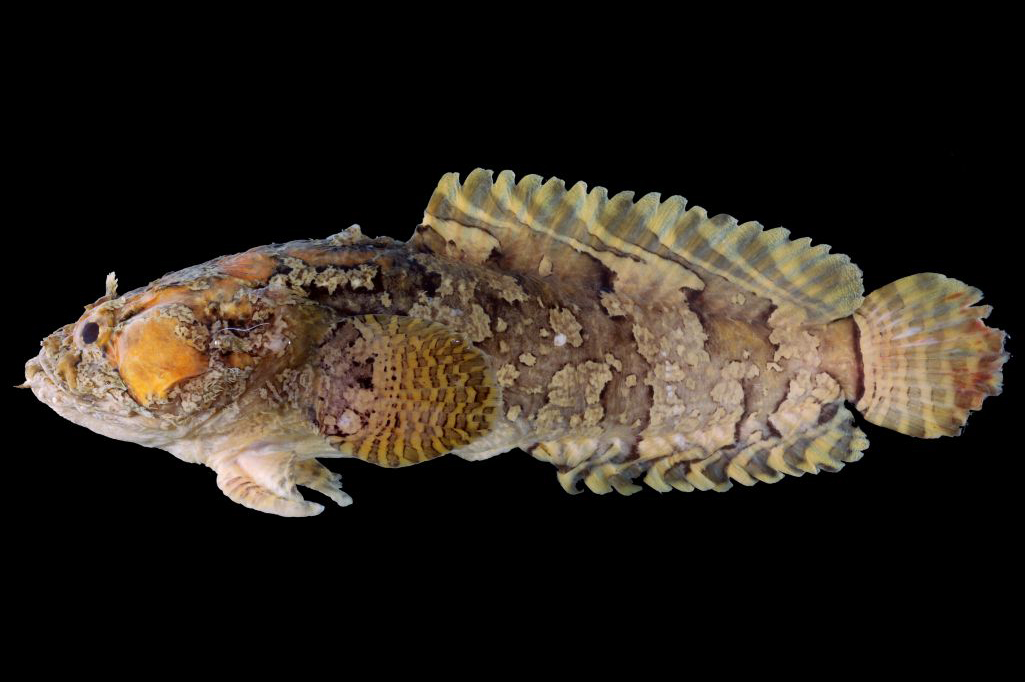
- Three-spined Frogfish (Batrachomoeus trispinosus)

Scientific classification
- Kingdom: Animalia
- Phylum: Chordata
- Class: Actinopterygii
- Order: Batrachoidiformes
- Family: Batrachoididae
- Subfamily: Halophryninae
- Genus: Batrachomoeus; Ogilby, 1908

Type species
- Batrachomoeus broadbenti Ogilby, 1908

= Batrachomoeus =

Genus of fishes

Batrachomoeus is a genus of toadfishes.

== Species ==
The recognized species in this genus are:

- Batrachomoeus dahli (Rendahl (de), 1922) (Dahl's frogfish)
- Batrachomoeus dubius (J. White, 1790) (eastern frogfish)
- Batrachomoeus occidentalis Hutchins, 1976 (western frogfish)
- Batrachomoeus rubricephalus Hutchins, 1976 (pinkhead frogfish)
- Batrachomoeus trispinosus (Günther, 1861) (three-spined frogfish)
