= Kendall Broadbent =

English Australian naturalist and explorer

Kendall Broadbent (born Horsforth, Yorkshire 26 August 1837; died Brisbane, Queensland 16 January 1911) was an English Australian naturalist and explorer. He arrived in the Colony of Victoria with his father in 1852. He worked as a collector for François Louis Nompar de Caumont La Force, comte de Castelnau in Cape York and the Gulf of Carpentaria during 1873. In 1875 he was collecting for the British Museum (Natural History) around Port Moresby and from 1877–1879 he was collecting for Edward Pierson Ramsay of the Australian Museum. He then collected for the Queensland Museum between 1880 and 1893 before being appointed as an attendant at that museum in 1893, a post he remained in until the turn of the century. Broadbent collected the type specimen of the Rufous Bristlebird in 1858 and it was named Dasyornis broadbenti in his honour. He is also commemorated in one of the common names of Batrachomoeus trispinosus, Broadbent's frogfish. While in New Guinea he contacted a fever which remained with him for the rest of his life and in 1872 he survived the shipwreck of the Maria near Hinchinbrook Island. He was said to have collected specimens on expeditions in every part of Australia as well as in New Guinea.
