= Enteromius rouxi =

Conservation status
- Data Deficient (IUCN 3.1)

Scientific classification
- Kingdom: Animalia
- Phylum: Chordata
- Class: Actinopterygii
- Order: Cypriniformes
- Family: Cyprinidae
- Subfamily: Smiliogastrinae
- Genus: Enteromius
- Species: E. rouxi

Binomial name
- Enteromius rouxi (Daget, 1961)

Synonyms
- Barbus rouxi

Species of fish

Enteromius rouxi is a species of ray-finned fish in the genus Enteromius which is endemic to the Kouilou-Niari basin in the Republic of the Congo.

== Size ==
This species reaches a length of 5.7 cm (2.2 in).

== Etymology ==
The fish is named in honor of zoologist Charles Roux, of the Muséum national d'Histoire naturelle in Paris, who collected the holotype specimen.
