= Apterichtus australis =

Scientific classification
- Kingdom: Animalia
- Phylum: Chordata
- Class: Actinopterygii
- Order: Anguilliformes
- Family: Ophichthidae
- Genus: Apterichtus
- Species: A. australis

Binomial name
- Apterichtus australis McCosker & J. E. Randall, 2005

Species of fish

Apterichtus australis, the snake eel or South Pacific snake eel, is a species of snake eel native to the south Pacific Ocean where it occurs around the island groups of Rapa Iti, Pitcairn, Easter and the Kermadecs. It can be found at depths of from 12 to 100 metres (39 to 328 ft) inhabiting sandy areas near rocks or coral reefs. This species can reach a length of 40 centimetres (16 in) TL.

== Etymology ==
The species epithet "australis" refers to this species' southern (Latin australis) distribution.
