= Apterichtus anguiformis =

Scientific classification
- Domain: Eukaryota
- Kingdom: Animalia
- Phylum: Chordata
- Class: Actinopterygii
- Order: Anguilliformes
- Family: Ophichthidae
- Genus: Apterichtus
- Species: A. anguiformis

Binomial name
- Apterichtus anguiformis (W. K. H. Peters, 1877)

Synonyms
- Ophichthys anguiformis W. K. H. Peters, 1877; Verma anguiformis (W. K. H. Peters, 1877); Apterichthus anguiformis (Peters, 1877)

Species of fish

Apterichtus anguiformis, the slender finless eel, is a species of snake eel (family Ophichthidae). It was described by Wilhelm Peters in 1877. It is a marine, subtropical eel which is known from the eastern Atlantic Ocean, including the western Mediterranean Sea, Morocco, and Cape Verde. It dwells at a depth range of 10 to 40 metres (33 to 131 ft) and inhabits burrows formed in sand and mud sediments on the continental shelf. Males can reach a maximum total length of 49.3 centimetres (19.4 in).
