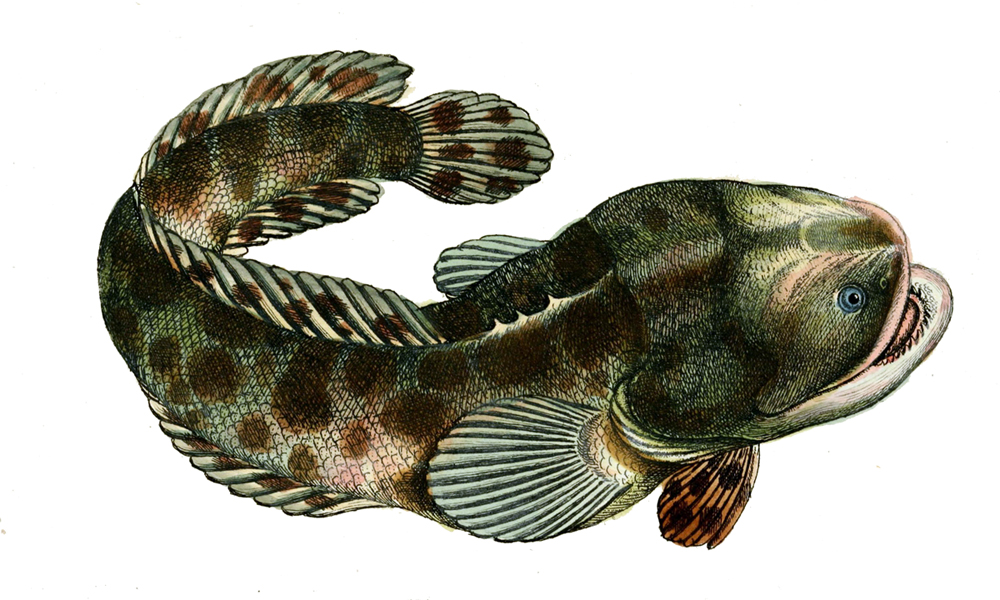
- Pacuma toadfish (B. surinamensis)

Scientific classification
- Kingdom: Animalia
- Phylum: Chordata
- Class: Actinopterygii
- Division: Teleostei
- Order: Batrachoidiformes
- Family: Batrachoididae
- Subfamily: Batrachoidinae
- Genus: Batrachoides; Lacépède, 1800

Type species
- Batrachoides tau Lacépède 1800

Synonyms
- Batrachus Bloch & Schneider, 1801

= Batrachoides =

Genus of fishes

Batrachoides is a genus of toadfishes.

== Species ==
The recognized species in this genus are:

- Batrachoides boulengeri C. H. Gilbert & Starks, 1904 (Boulenger's toadfish)
- Batrachoides gilberti Meek & Hildebrand, 1928 (large-eye toadfish)
- Batrachoides goldmani Evermann & Goldsborough, 1902 (Mexican freshwater toadfish)
- Batrachoides liberiensis (Steindachner, 1867) (hairy toadfish)
- Batrachoides manglae Cervigón, 1964 (cotuero toadfish)
- Batrachoides pacifici (Günther, 1861) (Pacific toadfish)
- Batrachoides surinamensis (Bloch & J. G. Schneider, 1801) (Pacuma toadfish)
- Batrachoides walkeri Collette & Russo, 1981 (Walker's toadfish)
- Batrachoides waltersi Collette & Russo, 1981 (Walters' toadfish)
