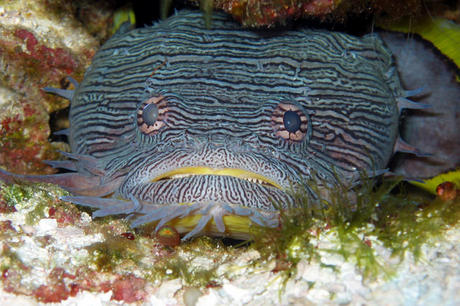
- Sanopus splendidus

Scientific classification
- Kingdom: Animalia
- Phylum: Chordata
- Class: Actinopterygii
- Order: Batrachoidiformes
- Family: Batrachoididae
- Subfamily: Batrachoidinae
- Genus: Sanopus; J. L. B. Smith, 1952

Type species
- Opsanus barbatus Meek & Hildebrand, 1928

= Sanopus =

Genus of fishes

Sanopus is a genus of toadfishes restricted to the Atlantic coast of Central America and Mexico.

== Species ==
The recognized species in this genus are:

- Sanopus astrifer (C. R. Robins & Starck, 1965) (whitespotted toadfish)
- Sanopus barbatus (Meek & Hildebrand, 1928) (bearded toadfish)
- Sanopus greenfieldorum Collette, 1983 (whitelined toadfish)
- Sanopus johnsoni Collette & Starck, 1974 (Cozumel toadfish)
- Sanopus reticulatus Collette, 1983 (reticulated toadfish)
- Sanopus splendidus Collette, Starck & P. C. Phillips, 1974 (splendid toadfish or coral toadfish)
