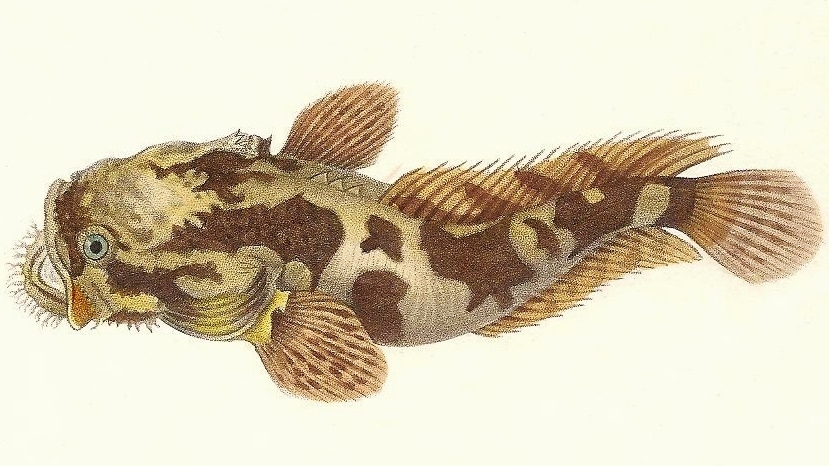
- Batrichthys apiatus

Scientific classification
- Kingdom: Animalia
- Phylum: Chordata
- Class: Actinopterygii
- Order: Batrachoidiformes
- Family: Batrachoididae
- Subfamily: Halophryninae
- Genus: Batrichthys; J. L. B. Smith, 1934

Type species
- Batrichthys albofasciatus J. L. B. Smith 1934

= Batrichthys =

Genus of fishes

Batrichthys is a genus of toadfishes.

== Species ==
The recognized species in this genus are:

- Batrichthys albofasciatus J. L. B. Smith, 1934 (white-ribbed toadfish)
- Batrichthys apiatus (Valenciennes, 1837) (snakehead toadfish)
