= Austrobatrachus =

Scientific classification
- Kingdom: Animalia
- Phylum: Chordata
- Class: Actinopterygii
- Order: Batrachoidiformes
- Family: Batrachoididae
- Subfamily: Halophryninae
- Genus: Austrobatrachus; J. L. B. Smith, 1949

Type species
- Pseudobatrachus foedus J. L. B. Smith, 1947

Genus of fishes

Austrobatrachus is a genus of toadfishes found in the Atlantic and Indian Oceans off the coast of South Africa.

== Species ==
The recognized species in this genus are:

- Austrobatrachus foedus (J. L. B. Smith, 1947) (puzzled toadfish)
- Austrobatrachus iselesele D. W. Greenfield, 2012
