= Chatrabus =

Scientific classification
- Kingdom: Animalia
- Phylum: Chordata
- Class: Actinopterygii
- Order: Batrachoidiformes
- Family: Batrachoididae
- Subfamily: Halophryninae
- Genus: Chatrabus; J. L. B. Smith, 1949

Type species
- Batrachoides melanurus Barnard, 1927

Genus of toadfishes

Chatrabus is a genus of toadfishes native to the coast of southern Africa.

== Species ==
There are currently three recognized species in this genus:

- Chatrabus felinus (J. L. B. Smith, 1952) (Pleated toadfish)
- Chatrabus hendersoni (J. L. B. Smith, 1952) (Chocolate toadfish)
- Chatrabus melanurus (Barnard, 1927) (Pony toadfish)
