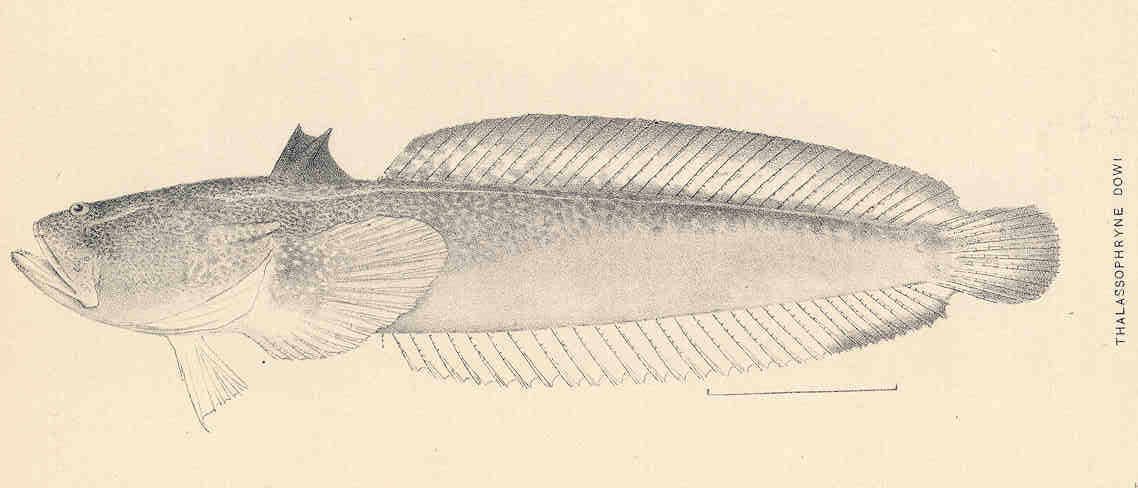
- Daector dowi

Scientific classification
- Domain: Eukaryota
- Kingdom: Animalia
- Phylum: Chordata
- Class: Actinopterygii
- Order: Batrachoidiformes
- Family: Batrachoididae
- Subfamily: Thalassophryninae
- Genus: Daector; Jordan & Evermann, 1898

Type species
- Thalassophryne dowi Jordan & Gilbert, 1887

= Daector =

Genus of fishes

Daector is a genus of toadfishes, with three species found along the Pacific Coast of Central America (one, D. dowi, reaches the Peruvian Coast of South America) and two species, D. gerringi and D. quadrizonatus, are found in South American rivers.

== Species ==
The currently recognized species in this genus are:

- Daector dowi (Jordan & C. H. Gilbert, 1887) (Dow's toadfish)
- Daector gerringi (Rendahl (de), 1941)
- Daector quadrizonatus (C. H. Eigenmann, 1922)
- Daector reticulata (Günther, 1864) (reticulated toadfish)
- Daector schmitti Collette, 1968 (Schmitt's toadfish)
