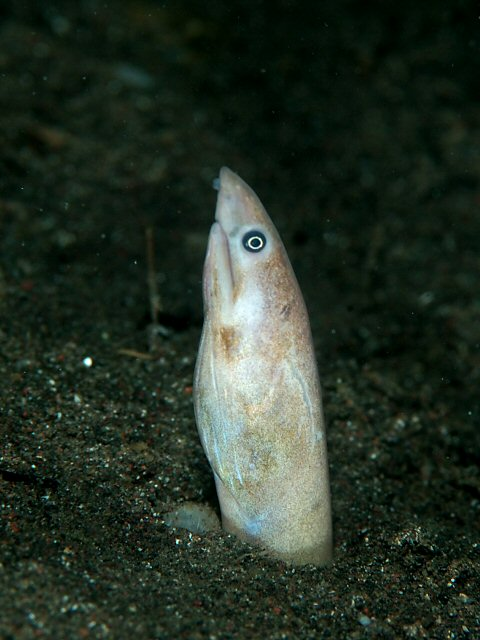

Scientific classification
- Kingdom: Animalia
- Phylum: Chordata
- Class: Actinopterygii
- Order: Anguilliformes
- Family: Ophichthidae
- Genus: Apterichtus
- Species: A. moseri

Binomial name
- Apterichtus moseri (D. S. Jordan & Snyder, 1901)

Synonyms
- Sphagebranchus moseri D. S. Jordan & Snyder, 1901

= Apterichtus moseri =

Species of fish

Apterichtus moseri is a species of snake eel native to the northwestern Pacific Ocean where it is only known from Suruga Bay and the Kumano-nada Sea in Japan. It occurs at depths of from 111 to 114 metres (364 to 374 ft). This species has been recorded as reaching 5 centimetres (2.0 in) TL for a female specimen.
