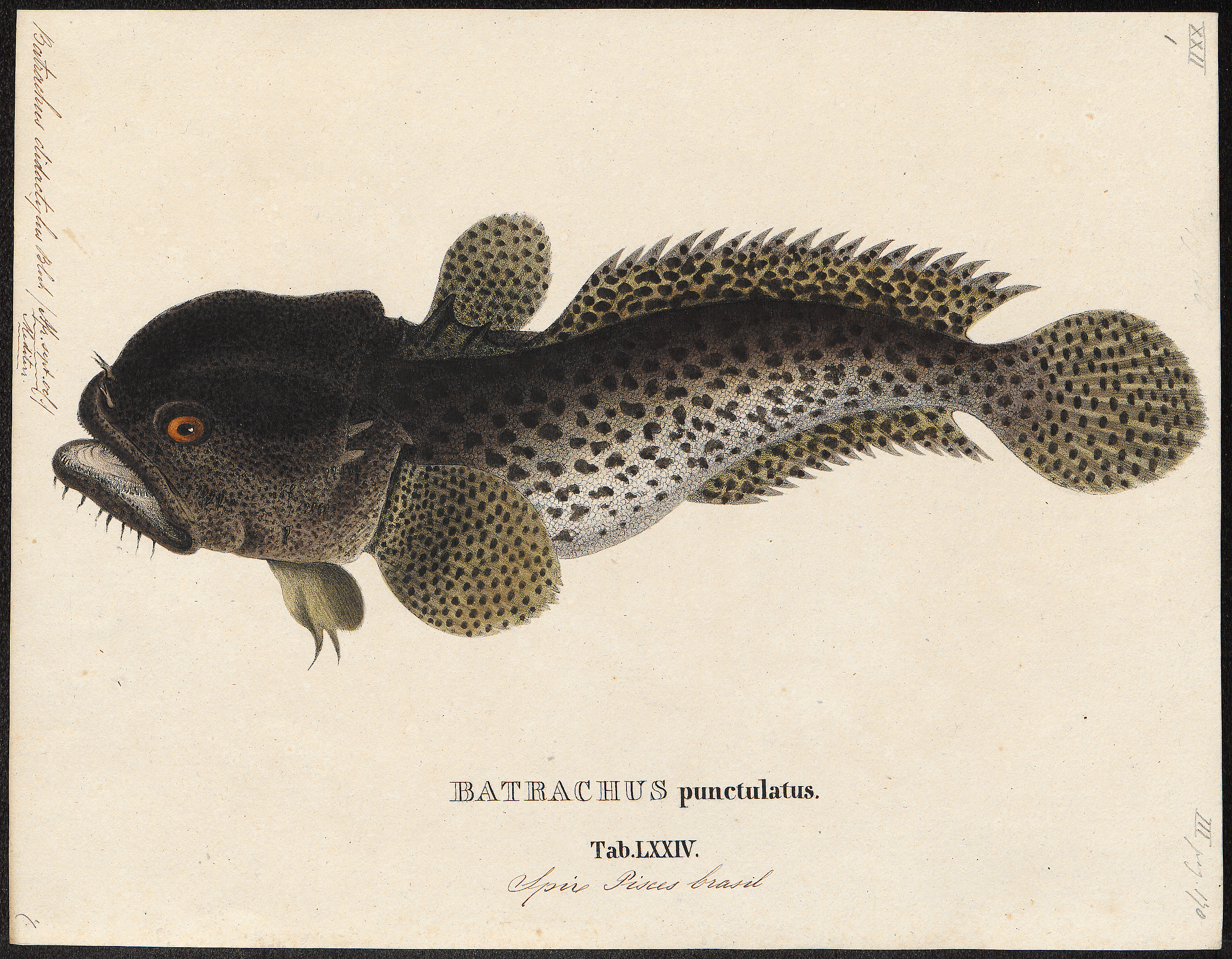

Conservation status
- Least Concern (IUCN 3.1)

Scientific classification
- Kingdom: Animalia
- Phylum: Chordata
- Class: Actinopterygii
- Order: Batrachoidiformes
- Family: Batrachoididae
- Subfamily: Halophryninae
- Genus: Halobatrachus; J. D. Ogilby, 1908
- Species: H. didactylus

Binomial name
- Halobatrachus didactylus (Bloch & J. G. Schneider, 1801)
- Distribution of Halobatrachus didactylus

Synonyms
- Batrachus didactylus Bloch & Schneider, 1801; Batrachoides didactylus (Bloch & Schneider, 1801); Batrachus conspicillum Cuvier, 1829; Batrachus punctatus Agassiz, 1831; Batrachus borealis Nilsson, 1832; Batrachus planifrons Guichenot, 1850; Batrachoides planifrons (Guichenot, 1850); Batrachus algeriensis Guichenot, 1850; Batrachus guentheri Bleeker, 1863

= Lusitanian toadfish =

Species of toadfish

The Lusitanian toadfish (Halobatrachus didactylus) is a species of toadfish found along the Atlantic and Mediterranean Coasts of western Europe and western Africa, from the Bay of Biscay to Ghana, with an isolated and old northern record from the Norwegian side of the Kattegat. This species grows to a length of 50 centimetres (20 in). This species is of minor importance to local commercial fisheries. Locally, it is known as gripau (Catalan), charroco, encharroco, xarroco (Portuguese), and pez sapo (Spanish)).

The fish is also known to make a variety of noises, such as whistles, grunts, croaks, and a boatwhistle that is used both to attract females and to deter intruding males.

The Lusitanian toadfish is a sedentary fish which is found in substrates consisting of soft sand or mud and which often lies partially buried or conceals itself in rock crevices. They are solitary fish of shallow waters. It is a predator feeding on crustaceans, molluscs and smaller fish. It is an oviparous species and after laying, the female leaves the eggs to be guarded by the male. It is found at depths of less than 60 metres (200 ft).

The Lusitanian toadfish is of minor importance to fisheries, it is taken by artisanal fisheries and as bycatch. It is marketed fresh but also used for fishmeal and to make oil.
