= Triathalassothia =

Scientific classification
- Kingdom: Animalia
- Phylum: Chordata
- Class: Actinopterygii
- Order: Batrachoidiformes
- Family: Batrachoididae
- Subfamily: Halophryninae
- Genus: Triathalassothia; Fowler, 1943

Type species
- Triathalassothia devincenzii (a junior synonym of Triathalassothia argentina) Fowler, 1943

Genus of fishes

Triathalassothia is a genus of toadfishes found in the southwest Atlantic Ocean.

== Species ==
There are currently two recognized species in this genus:

- Triathalassothia argentina (C. Berg (es), 1897)
- Triathalassothia lambaloti Menezes & J. L. de Figueiredo, 1998
