= Broadbodied toadfish =

Conservation status
- Data Deficient (IUCN 3.1)

Scientific classification
- Kingdom: Animalia
- Phylum: Chordata
- Class: Actinopterygii
- Order: Batrachoidiformes
- Family: Batrachoididae
- Subfamily: Halophryninae
- Genus: Riekertia
- Species: R. ellisi

Binomial name
- Riekertia ellisi J. L. B. Smith, 1952

Species of fish

The broadbodied toadfish (Riekertia ellisi) is a species of toadfish only known from the coasts of South Africa. This species grows to a length of 29 centimetres (11 in) TL. Its binomial name honours two people: the generic name honours Dr. C. Riekert who sent J. L. B. Smith "many specimens", while the specific name honours P. V. Ellis who collected the type specimen.
