= Vladichthys =

Conservation status
- Vulnerable (IUCN 3.1)

Scientific classification
- Kingdom: Animalia
- Phylum: Chordata
- Class: Actinopterygii
- Division: Teleostei
- Order: Batrachoidiformes
- Family: Batrachoididae
- Subfamily: Batrachoidinae
- Genus: Vladichthys; D. W. Greenfield, 2006
- Species: V. gloverensis

Binomial name
- Vladichthys gloverensis (D. W. Greenfield & T. A. Greenfield, 1973)

Synonyms
- Triathalassothia gloverensis Greenfield & Greenfield, 1973; Amphichthys gloverensis (Greenfield & Greenfield, 1973)

Species of fish

Vladichthys gloverensis is a species of toadfish known only from the Atlantic Coast of Belize and Honduras, where it can be found on reefs. This species grows to a standard length of 5.6 cm (2.2 in). The generic name of V. gloverensis honors the toadfish expert Vladimir "Vlad" Walters (1927-1987), while the specific name refers to its discovery on Glover's Reef in Belize.
