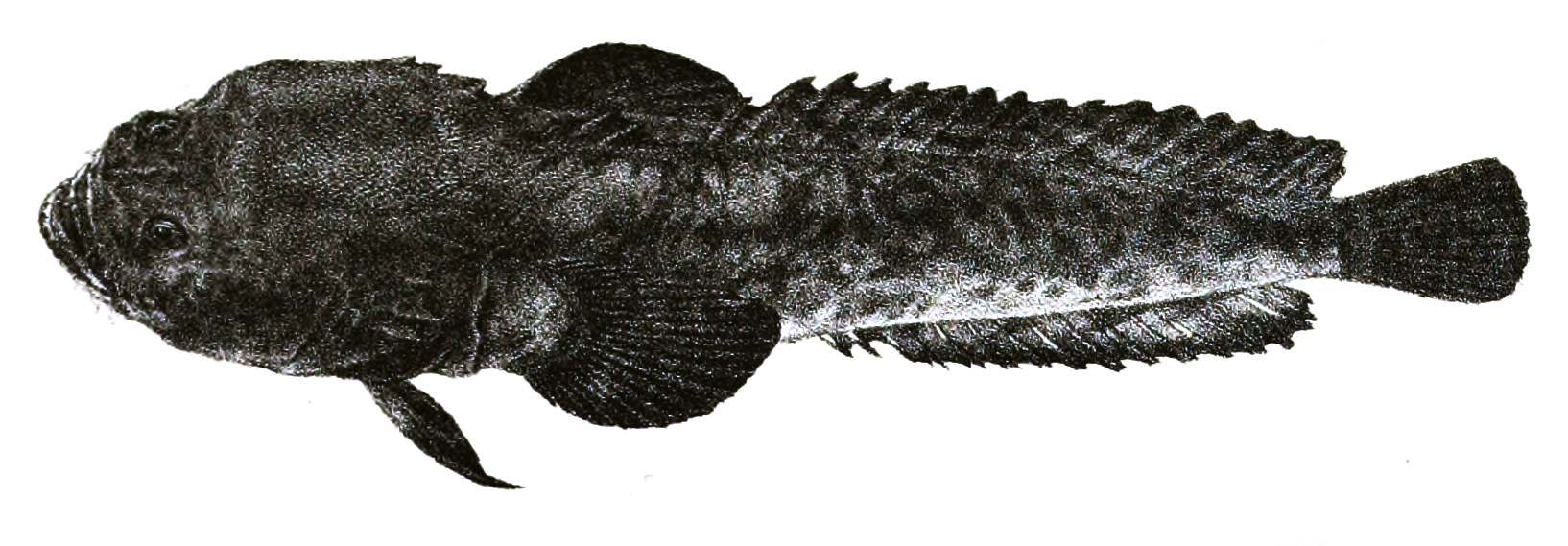
- Allenbatrachus grunniens

Scientific classification
- Kingdom: Animalia
- Phylum: Chordata
- Class: Actinopterygii
- Order: Batrachoidiformes
- Family: Batrachoididae
- Subfamily: Halophryninae
- Genus: Allenbatrachus; D. W. Greenfield, 1997

Type species
- Cottus grunniens Linnaeus, 1758

= Allenbatrachus =

Genus of fishes

Allenbatrachus is a genus of toadfishes found in the Indian and western Pacific Oceans. The generic name honours the Humboldt State University ichthyologist George Allen (1923-2011), who introduced David Greenfield, who coined the name, to ichthyology.

== Species ==
The recognized species in this genus are:

- Allenbatrachus grunniens (Linnaeus, 1758) (grunting toadfish)
- Allenbatrachus meridionalis D. W. Greenfield & W. L. Smith, 2004
- Allenbatrachus reticulatus (Steindachner, 1870)
