= Two-faced toadfish =

Conservation status
- Endangered (IUCN 3.1)

Scientific classification
- Kingdom: Animalia
- Phylum: Chordata
- Class: Actinopterygii
- Order: Batrachoidiformes
- Family: Batrachoididae
- Subfamily: Halophryninae
- Genus: Bifax
- Species: B. lacinia

Binomial name
- Bifax lacinia D. W. Greenfield, Mee & J. E. Randall, 1994

Species of fish

The two-faced toadfish (Bifax lacinia) is a species of toadfish known only from the coast of Oman. This species grows to a length of 33 cm (13 in). It faces threats from habitat destruction, oil spills, pollution from runoff, and more. Their populations continue to decline.
