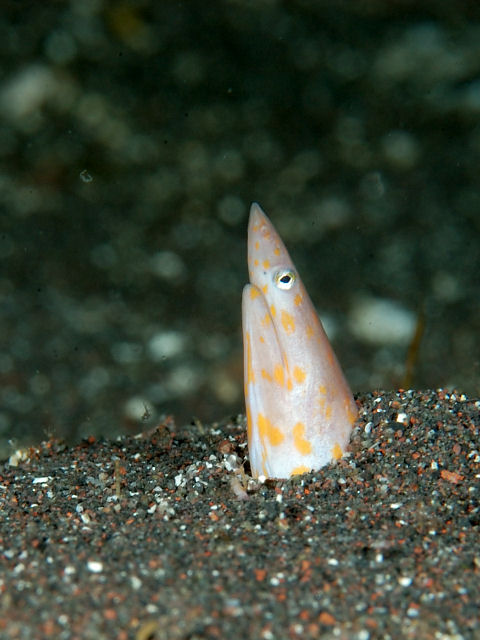

Scientific classification
- Kingdom: Animalia
- Phylum: Chordata
- Class: Actinopterygii
- Order: Anguilliformes
- Family: Ophichthidae
- Genus: Apterichtus
- Species: A. klazingai

Binomial name
- Apterichtus klazingai (Weber, 1913)

Synonyms
- Sphagebranchus klazingai M. C. W. Weber, 1913; Apterichthys klazingai (Weber, 1913); Apterichtus klanzingai (Weber, 1913)

= Apterichtus klazingai =

Species of fish

The sharpsnout snake eel (Apterichtus klazingai) is an eel in the family Ophichthidae (worm/snake eels). It was described by Max Carl Wilhelm Weber in 1913. It is a marine, tropical eel which is known from the Indo-Western Pacific, including East Africa, the Marshall Islands, and the Hawaiian Islands. It dwells at a depth range of 10 to 25 metres (33 to 82 ft), and lives in congregations in confined regions of sand sediments. Males can reach a maximum total length of 40 centimetres (16 in).

The sharpsnout snake eel's diet consists of crabs, shrimp, and bony fish.
