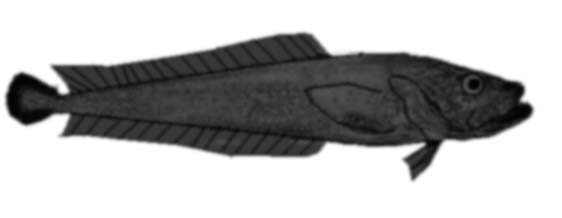

Conservation status
- Least Concern (IUCN 3.1)

Scientific classification
- Kingdom: Animalia
- Phylum: Chordata
- Class: Actinopterygii
- Order: Batrachoidiformes
- Family: Batrachoididae
- Subfamily: Porichthyinae
- Genus: Aphos; C. L. Hubbs & L. P. Schultz, 1939
- Species: A. porosus

Binomial name
- Aphos porosus (Valenciennes, 1837)

Synonyms
- Batrachus porosus Valenciennes, 1837; Porichthys afuerae Evermann & Radcliffe, 1917

= Banded toadfish =

Species of fish

The banded toadfish (Aphos porosus) is a species of toadfish found along the Pacific coast of South America where it is found in Chile, Ecuador and Peru. This species grows to a length of 28 centimetres (11 in) TL. It is the only member of the monotypic genus Aphos. Unlike the other genus, Porichthys in this subfamily the banded toadfish lacks photophores.

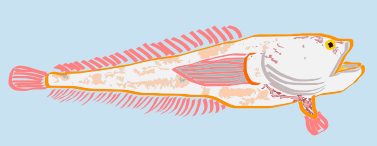
