= Apterichtus gracilis =

Conservation status
- Data Deficient (IUCN 3.1)

Scientific classification
- Domain: Eukaryota
- Kingdom: Animalia
- Phylum: Chordata
- Class: Actinopterygii
- Order: Anguilliformes
- Family: Ophichthidae
- Genus: Apterichtus
- Species: A. gracilis

Binomial name
- Apterichtus gracilis (Kaup, 1856)

Synonyms
- Ophisurapus gracilis Kaup, 1856

Species of fish

Apterichtus gracilis is a species of snake eel native to the eastern Atlantic Ocean off the coast of western Africa. It is known to occur on the continental shelf in mud or sand substrates in which it makes its burrows. It has been recorded at a depth of 75 metres (246 ft). This species can reach a length of at least 31.9 centimetres (12.6 in) TL.
