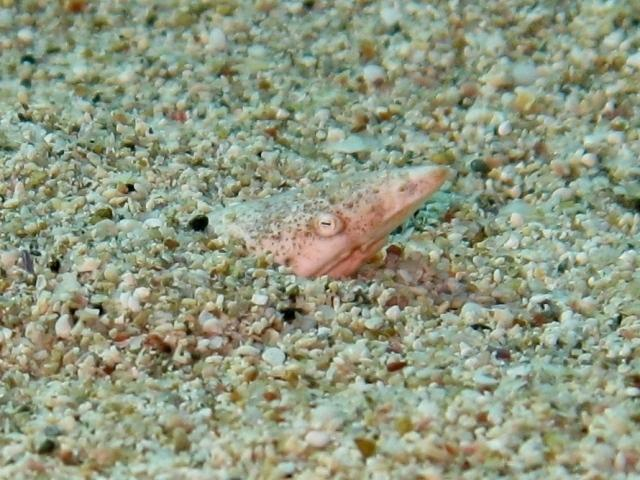

Conservation status
- Least Concern (IUCN 3.1)

Scientific classification
- Kingdom: Animalia
- Phylum: Chordata
- Class: Actinopterygii
- Order: Anguilliformes
- Family: Ophichthidae
- Genus: Apterichtus
- Species: A. caecus

Binomial name
- Apterichtus caecus (Linnaeus, 1758)

Synonyms
- Muraena caeca Linnaeus, 1758; Caecula caeca (Linnaeus, 1758); Ophichthys caecus (Linnaeus, 1758); Sphagebranchus caecus (Linnaeus, 1758); Caecula apterygia Vahl, 1794; Caecilia branderiana Lacépède, 1800; Apterichtus branderiana (Lacépède, 1800)

= Apterichtus caecus =

Species of fish

Apterichtus caecus, the European finless eel, is a species of snake eel native to the eastern Atlantic Ocean, from the Azores to the Gulf of Guinea, and into the western Mediterranean including the Balearic Islands. It can be found on the continental shelf at depths of from 10 to 40 metres (33 to 131 ft) living in burrows in mud or sand. It preys on other fishes as well as benthic invertebrates. Spawning for this species in the Mediterranean has been recorded in the early summer months of May and June. This species can reach a length of 60 centimetres (24 in) TL.
