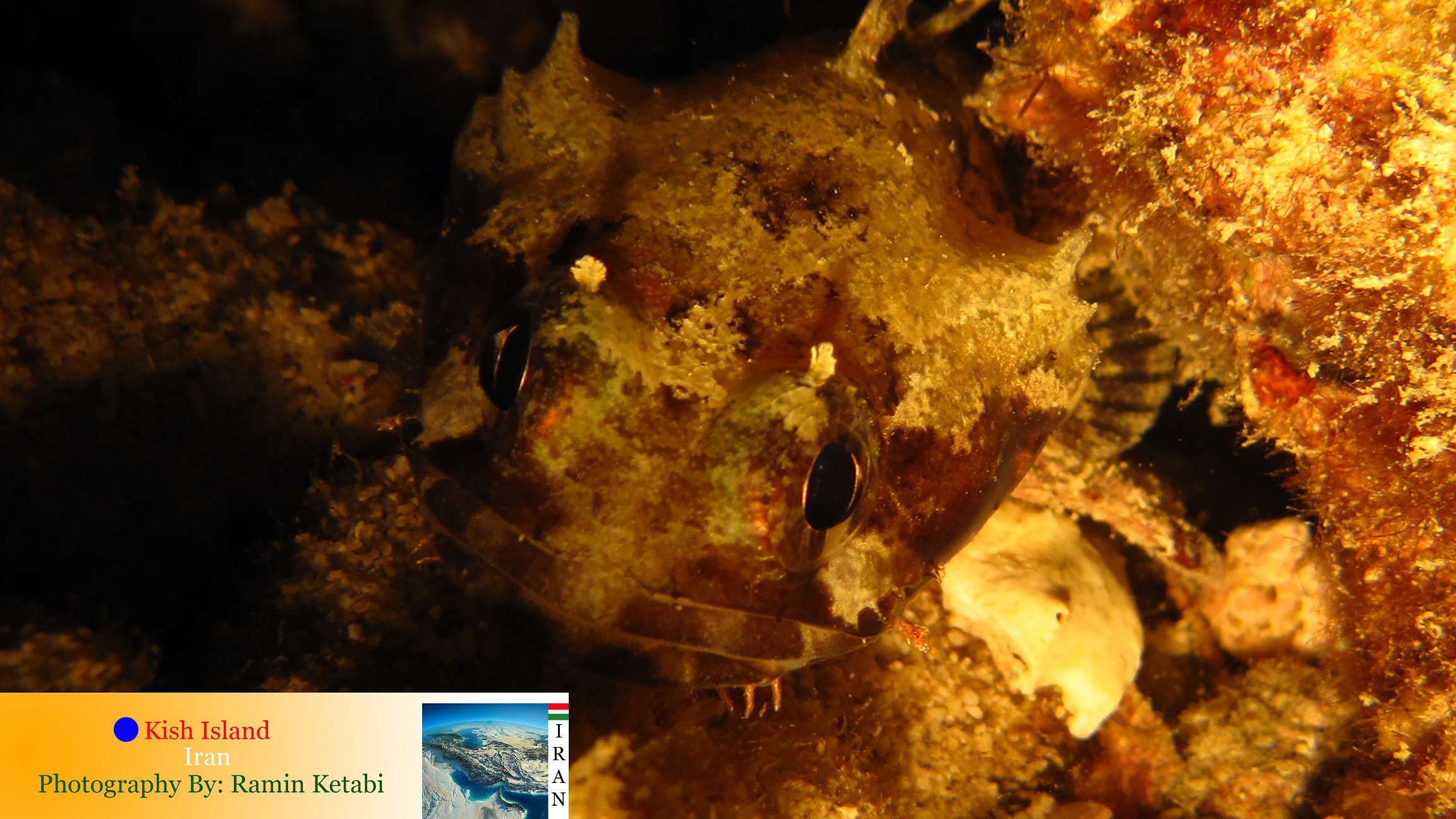
- Colletteichthys dussumieri

Scientific classification
- Kingdom: Animalia
- Phylum: Chordata
- Class: Actinopterygii
- Order: Batrachoidiformes
- Family: Batrachoididae
- Subfamily: Halophryninae
- Genus: Colletteichthys; D. W. Greenfield, 2006

Type species
- Batrachus dussumieri Valenciennes, 1837

= Colletteichthys =

Genus of fishes

Colletteichthys is a genus of toadfishes found in the western Indian Ocean. The generic name is a compound of the surname Collette, in honour of the American ichthyologist Bruce Baden Collette to recognise his contribution to the study of toadfish, and the Greek ichthys meaning "fish".

== Species ==
The recognized species in this genus are:

- Colletteichthys dussumieri (Valenciennes, 1837) (flat toadfish)
- Colletteichthys flavipinnis D. W. Greenfield, Bineesh & Akhilesh, 2012
- Colletteichthys occidentalis D. W. Greenfield, 2012 (Arabian toadfish)
