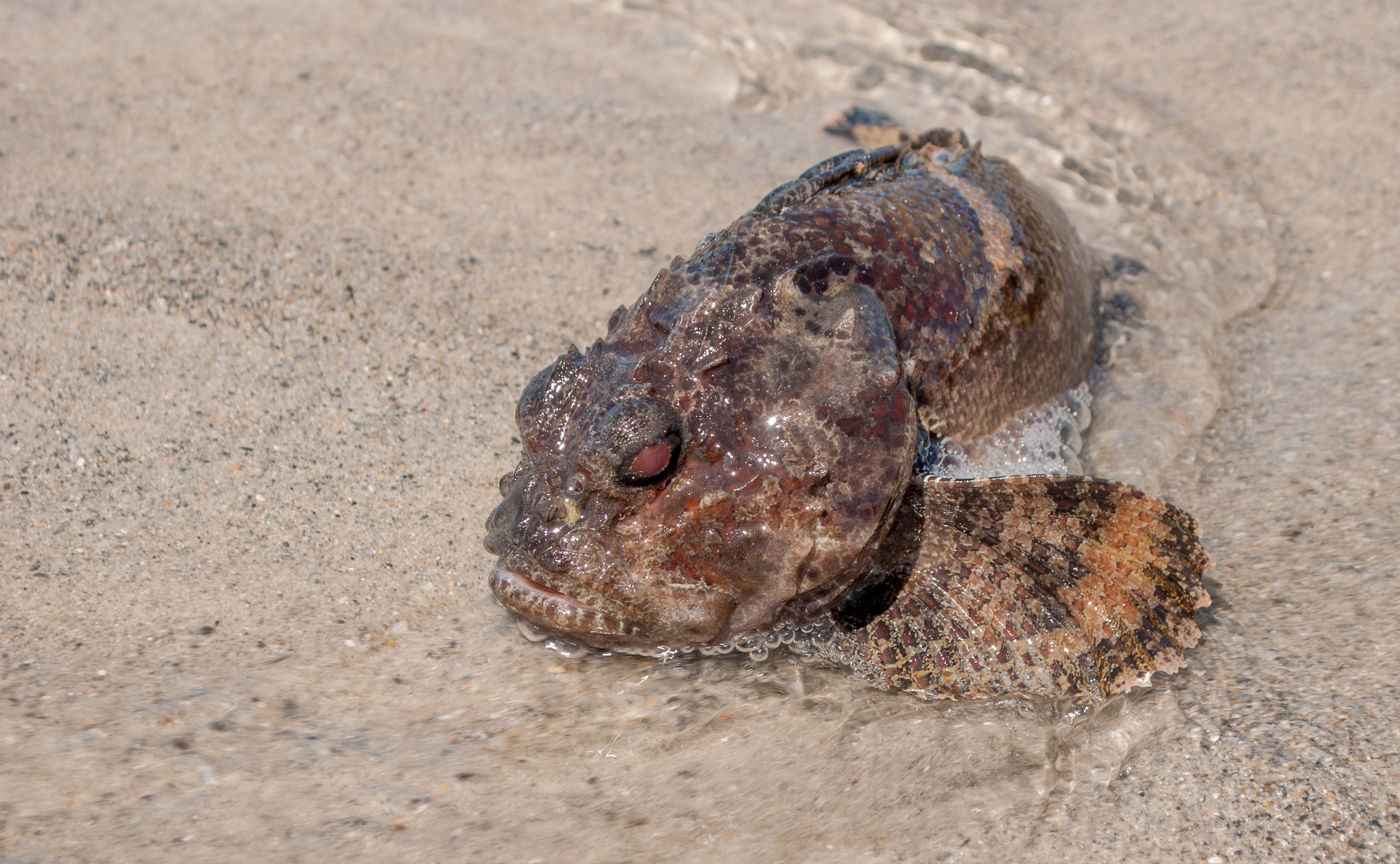
- Amphichthys cryptocentrus

Scientific classification
- Kingdom: Animalia
- Phylum: Chordata
- Class: Actinopterygii
- Order: Batrachoidiformes
- Family: Batrachoididae
- Subfamily: Batrachoidinae
- Genus: Amphichthys; Swainson, 1839

Type species
- Amphichthys rubigenes Swainson, 1839

= Amphichthys =

Genus of fishes

Amphichthys is a genus of toadfishes found in the western Atlantic Ocean.

== Species ==
The recognized species in this genus are:

- Amphichthys cryptocentrus (Valenciennes, 1837) (Bocon toadfish)
- Amphichthys rubigenis Swainson, 1839
