= Barchatus =

Scientific classification
- Kingdom: Animalia
- Phylum: Chordata
- Class: Actinopterygii
- Order: Batrachoidiformes
- Family: Batrachoididae
- Subfamily: Halophryninae
- Genus: Barchatus; J. L. B. Smith, 1952

Type species
- Batrachus cirrhosis Klunzinger 1871

Genus of fishes

Barchatus is a genus of toadfish native to the western Indian Ocean, Somalia and the Red Sea.

== Species ==
There are currently 2 recognized species in this genus:

- Barchatus cirrhosus Klunzinger, 1871
- Barchatus indicus D. W. Greenfield, 2014
