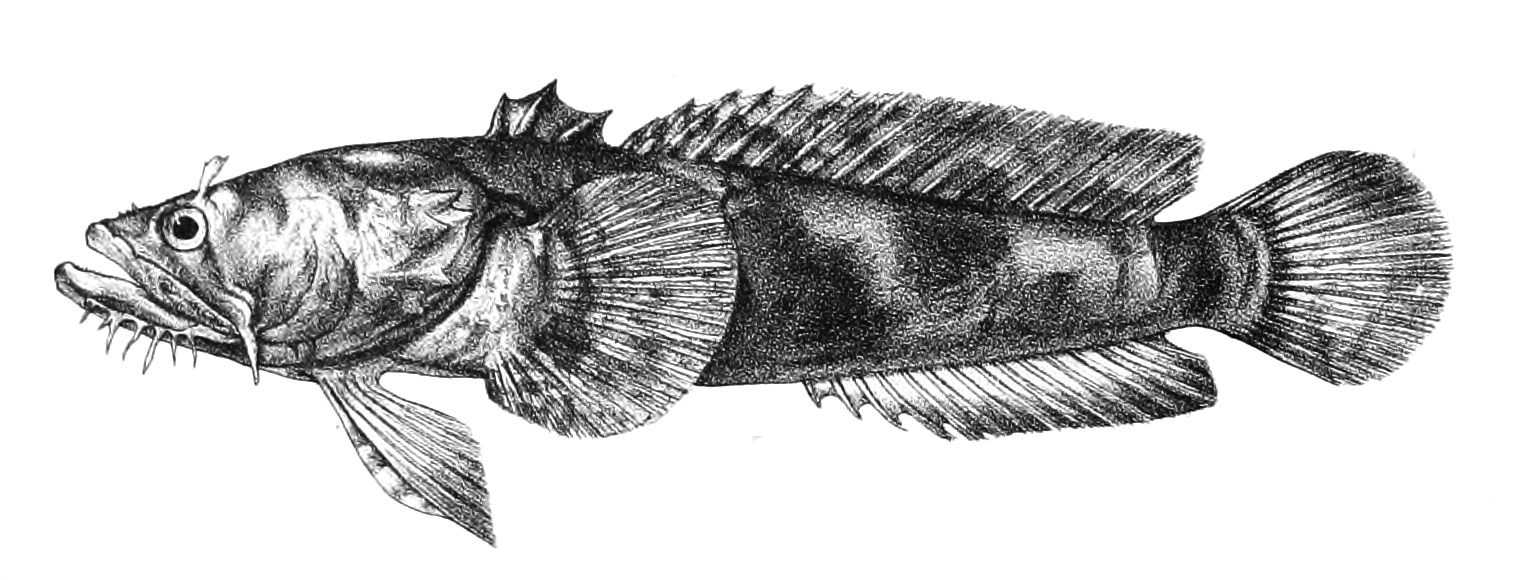
- Allenbatrachus grunniens

Scientific classification
- Kingdom: Animalia
- Phylum: Chordata
- Class: Actinopterygii
- Order: Batrachoidiformes
- Family: Batrachoididae
- Subfamily: Halophryninae; Greenfield, Winterbottom & Collette, 2008

= Halophryninae =

Subfamily of fishes

The Halophryninae is a largely Old World subfamily of toadfish, part of the family Batrachoididae.

== Genera ==
The following genera are classified as members of the Halophryninae:

- Allenbatrachus Greenfield, 1997
- Austrobatrachus J. L. B. Smith, 1949
- Barchatus J. L. B. Smith, 1952
- Batrachomoeus Ogilby, 1908
- Batrichthys J. L. B. Smith, 1934
- Bifax Greenfield, Mee and Randall, 1994
- Chatrabus J. L. B. Smith, 1949
- Colletteichthys Greenfield, 2006
- Halobatrachus Ogilby, 1908
- Halophryne Gill, 1863
- Perulibatrachus Roux and Whitley, 1972
- Riekertia J. L. B. Smith, 1952
- Triathalassothia Fowler, 1943
