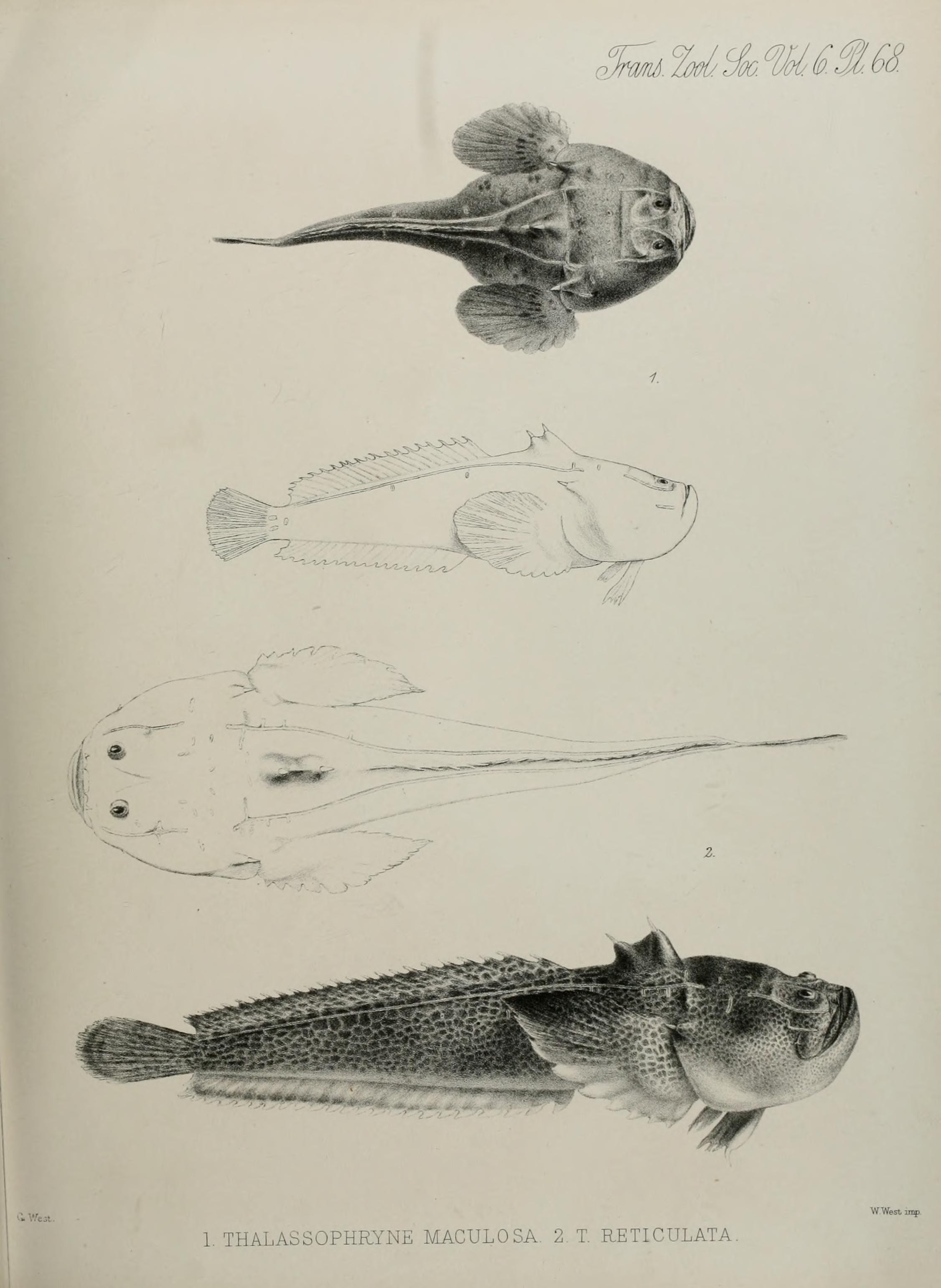
- Daector reticulata

Scientific classification
- Kingdom: Animalia
- Phylum: Chordata
- Class: Actinopterygii
- Order: Batrachoidiformes
- Family: Batrachoididae
- Subfamily: Thalassophryninae; Miranda-Ribeiro, 1915

= Thalassophryninae =

Subfamily of fishes

Thalassophryninae is a subfamily of toadfish in the family Batrachoididae. The species in the subfamily are characterised by the possession of two dorsal fin spines, a lack of subopercular spines, with the dorsal and opercular spines being hollow and have venom glands at their base. They do not have canine teeth.

== Genera ==
There are two genera in the Thalassophryninae:

- Daector Jordan & Evermann, 1898
- Thalassophryne Günther, 1861
