= Apterichtus orientalis =

Scientific classification
- Domain: Eukaryota
- Kingdom: Animalia
- Phylum: Chordata
- Class: Actinopterygii
- Order: Anguilliformes
- Family: Ophichthidae
- Genus: Apterichtus
- Species: A. orientalis

Binomial name
- Apterichtus orientalis Machida & Ohta, 1994

Species of fish

Apterichtus orientalis is a species of snake eel native to the northwestern Pacific Ocean where it is known only from the Kii Peninsula in western Japan. It can be found at depths of from 79 to 81 metres (259 to 266 ft) where it occurs on substrates of sand or mud. It can reach a length of 31.8 centimetres (12.5 in) TL (measured from a female specimen).

== Etymology ==
The species epithet "orientalis" is derived from the word "Oriental", a reference to this species being found in the Far East, which in turn derives from the Latin "oriens" (rising).
