= George Allen (ichthyologist) =

American ichthyologist

George Herbert Allen (August 16, 1923, Kusnacht, Switzerland – May 9, 2011, McKinleyville, California) was an American ichthyologist and fisheries scientist. His father was a US consul and they family moved to Calgary with his father's posting in 1927 and George remained there until he went to the University of Wyoming as an undergraduate where he graduated before entering the military during the Second World War. After the war he completed his master's and doctorate degrees at the University of Washington in 1956, where he met his wife, Beverly Robinson. He started a position at the Cal Poly Humboldt an association which was to last over 30 years, ending his career as a professor of fisheries. At Cal Poly Humboldt he played an important part in setting up the university's oceanography program and its graduate program in fisheries. He was awarded the President's Distinguished Service Award by the Cal Poly Humboldt and had a lab and part of the Arcata Wastewater Treatment Plant and Wildlife Sanctuary was named in his honor. Allen was nicknamed "Fishy" by the Arcata, California, city hall workers he co-operated with in the creation of its pioneering artificial marsh wastewater treatment facility. The toadfish genus Allenbatrachus was named in his honor by one of his former students, David W. Greenfield, for Allen's introduction of Greenfield to ichthyology. He was survived by his wife, Beverley, and their three daughters.
