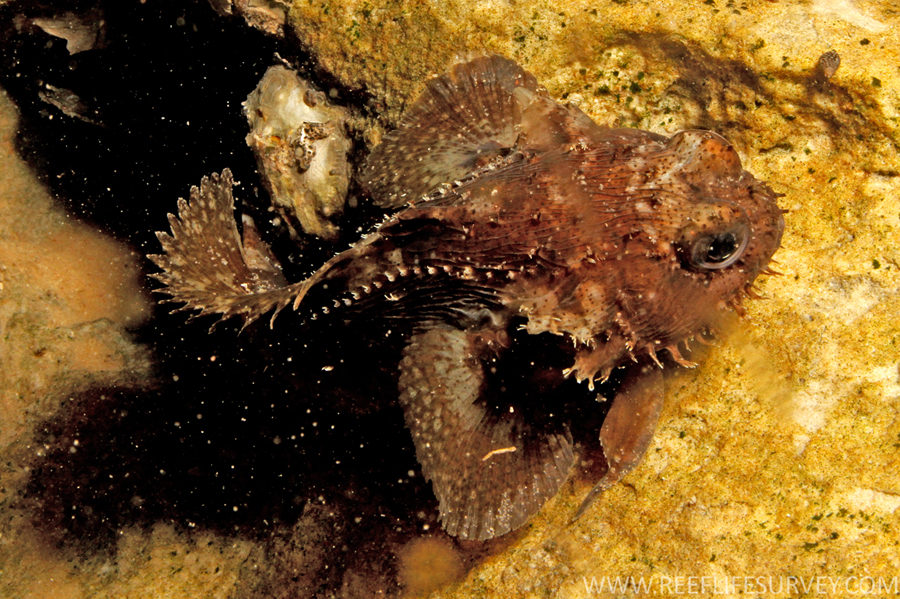
- Halophryne diemensis

Scientific classification
- Kingdom: Animalia
- Phylum: Chordata
- Class: Actinopterygii
- Division: Teleostei
- Order: Batrachoidiformes
- Family: Batrachoididae
- Subfamily: Halophryninae
- Genus: Halophryne; Gill, 1863

Type species
- Batrachoides diemensis Lesueur, 1824

= Halophryne =

Genus of fishes

Halophryne is a genus of toadfishes found in the Pacific and Indian Oceans.

== Species ==
There are currently four recognized species in this genus:

- Halophryne diemensis (Lesueur, 1824) (Banded frogfish)
- Halophryne hutchinsi D. W. Greenfield, 1998
- Halophryne ocellatus Hutchins, 1974 (Ocellate frogfish)
- Halophryne queenslandiae (De Vis, 1882) (Sculptured frogfish)
