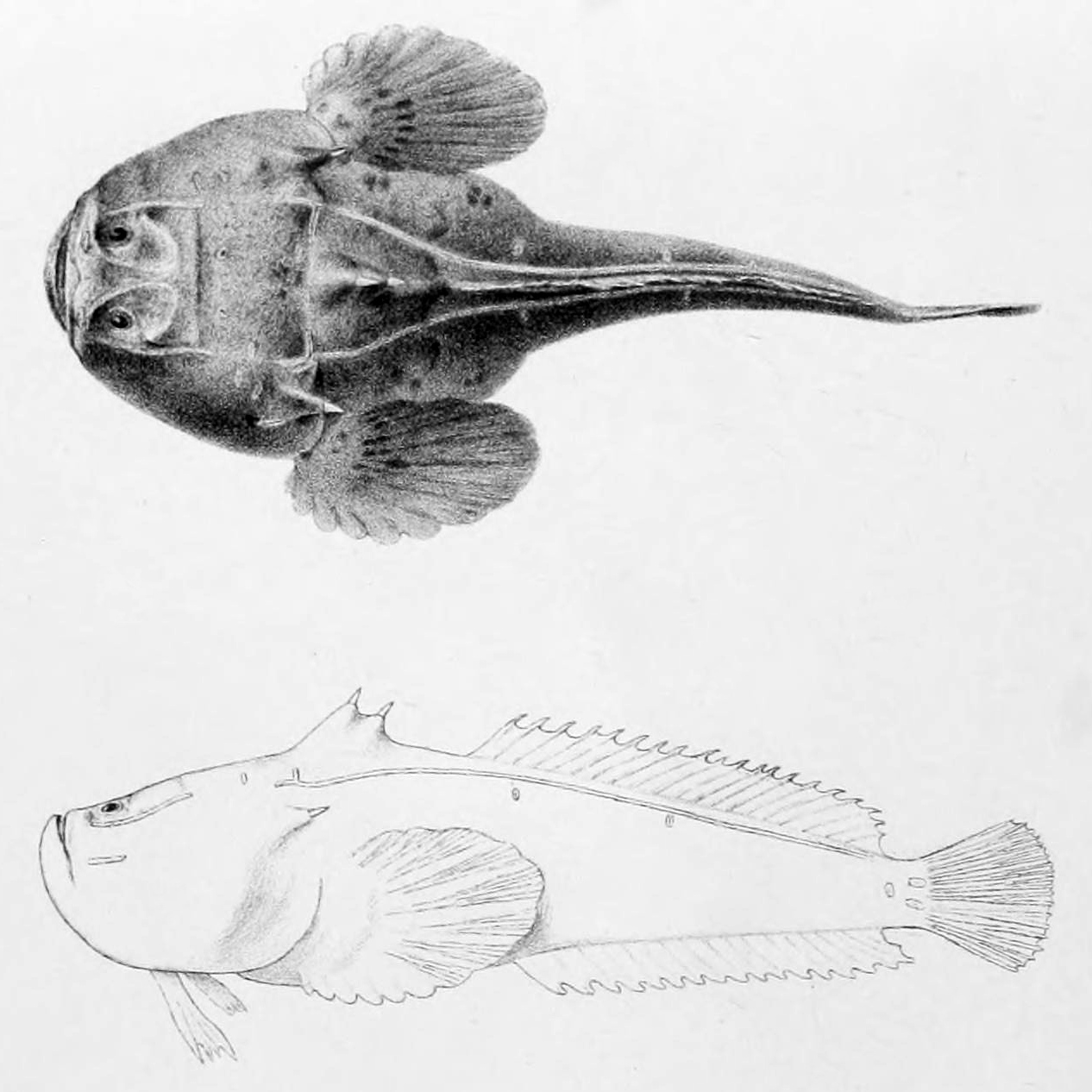
- Thalassophryne maculosa

Scientific classification
- Domain: Eukaryota
- Kingdom: Animalia
- Phylum: Chordata
- Class: Actinopterygii
- Order: Batrachoidiformes
- Family: Batrachoididae
- Subfamily: Thalassophryninae
- Genus: Thalassophryne; Günther, 1861

Type species
- Thalassophryne maculosa Günther, 1861

= Thalassophryne =

Genus of fishes

Thalassophryne is a genus of toadfishes found in the western Atlantic Ocean with one species (T. amazonica) found in the Amazon River and some of its tributaries.

== Species ==
There are currently six recognized species in this genus:

- Thalassophryne amazonica Steindachner, 1876
- Thalassophryne maculosa Günther, 1861 (Cano toadfish)
- Thalassophryne megalops B. A. Bean & A. C. Weed, 1910
- Thalassophryne montevidensis (C. Berg (es), 1893)
- Thalassophryne nattereri Steindachner, 1876
- Thalassophryne punctata Steindachner, 1876

== Venom ==
Members of the genus Thalassophyne are venomous. Venom is delivered through two hollow spines on the dorsal fin and two spines on pre-opercular regions, a venomous gland is located at the base of the spines and can be erected or depressed by the fish.
