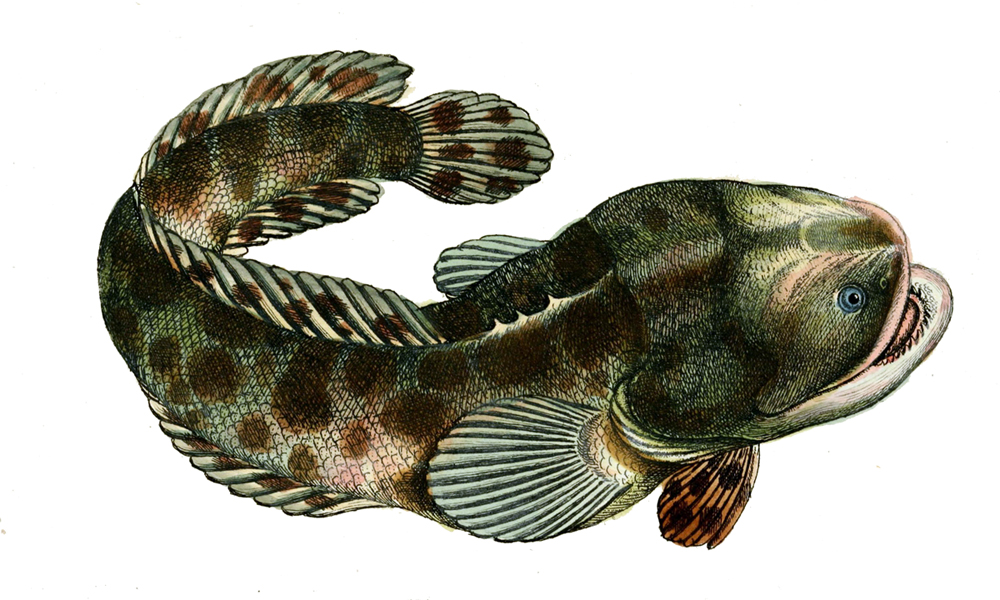

Conservation status
- Least Concern (IUCN 3.1)

Scientific classification
- Kingdom: Animalia
- Phylum: Chordata
- Class: Actinopterygii
- Division: Teleostei
- Order: Batrachoidiformes
- Family: Batrachoididae
- Genus: Batrachoides
- Species: B. surinamensis

Binomial name
- Batrachoides surinamensis (Bloch & J. G. Schneider, 1801)

Synonyms
- Batrachus surinamensis Bloch & Schneider, 1801; Batrachoides tau Lacépède, 1800

= Pacuma toadfish =

Species of fish

The Pacuma toadfish (Batrachoides surinamensis) is a species of toadfish found in the Caribbean Sea and Atlantic Ocean along the coasts of Central and South America from Honduras to Brazil. It is the largest toadfish, reaching a length up to 57 cm (22 in) and a maximum recorded weight of 2.3 kg (5.1 lb). This fish is found in local commercial fisheries and the aquarium trade.
