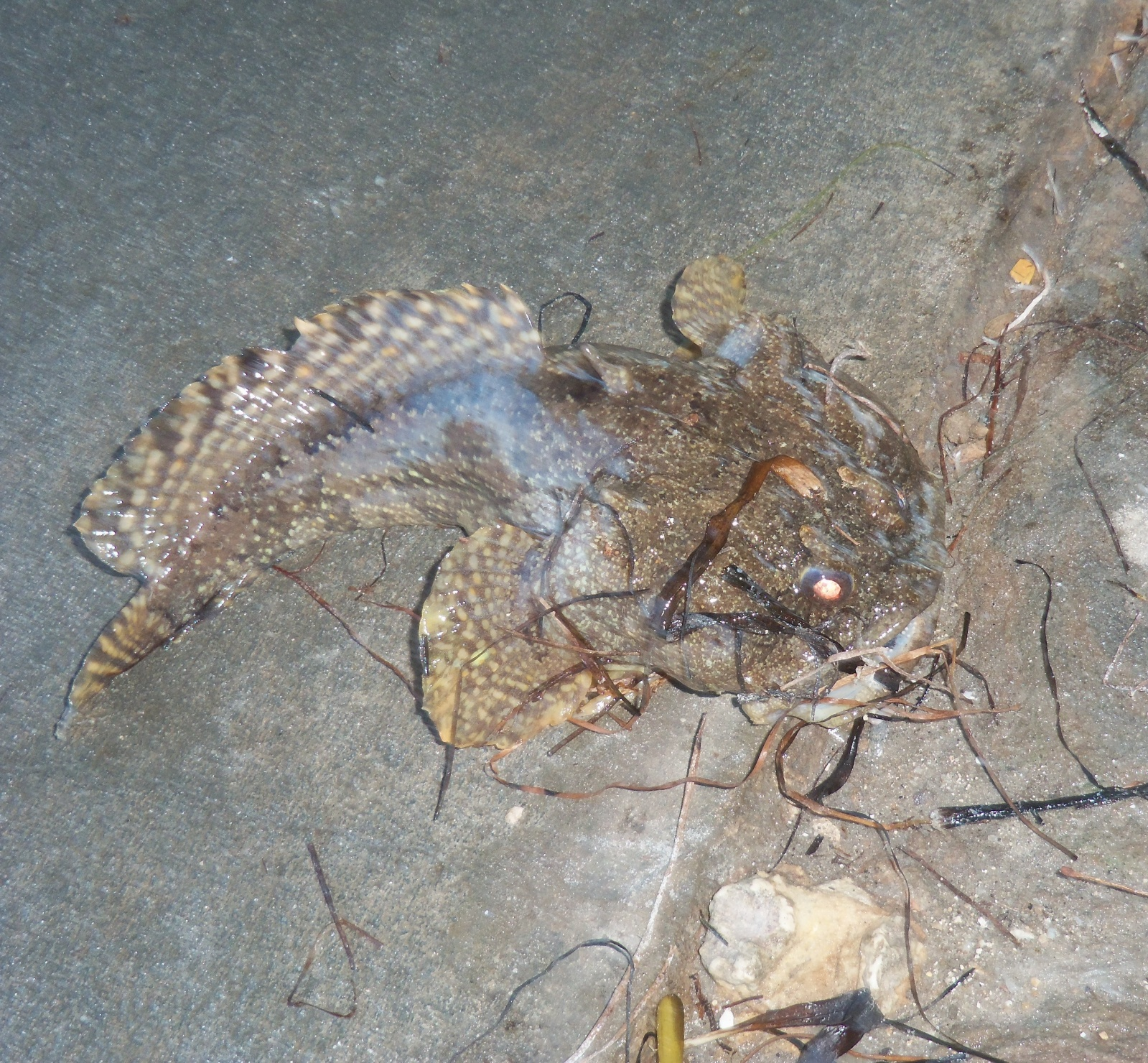
- Gulf toadfish after being caught by hook and line

Conservation status
- Least Concern (IUCN 3.1)

Scientific classification
- Kingdom: Animalia
- Phylum: Chordata
- Class: Actinopterygii
- Division: Teleostei
- Order: Batrachoidiformes
- Family: Batrachoididae
- Genus: Opsanus
- Species: O. beta

Binomial name
- Opsanus beta (Goode & Bean, 1880)

Synonyms
- Batrachus tau beta Goode & Bean, 1880; Opsanus vandeuseni Fowler, 1939

= Gulf toadfish =

Species of fish

The Gulf toadfish (Opsanus beta) is a species of toadfish found in the Gulf of Mexico.

== Description ==
The Gulf toadfish are elongate, tapering, robust toadfish with a depressed head. They are mottled tan, white, and brown with a darker posterior end. Their caudal and pectoral fins have dark brown bars on a pale background. The bars on the pectoral fins are irregularly joined. The dorsal and anal fins have oblique alternating brown and white bars. The dorsal fins have 24 or 25 rays, and the pectoral fins have 18 or 19 rays. Gulf toadfish commonly weigh 2 to 3 pounds (0.91 to 1.36 kg) and measure 11–14 inches (28–36 cm). However, smaller ones are sometimes caught, weighing 0.25 pounds (110 g) measuring 4–5 inches (10–13 cm).

== Distribution ==
The Gulf toadfish is found in the Gulf of Mexico, commonly inshore around bridges and structures such as pilings.

== Habitat ==
The Gulf toadfish is often found near shore in shallow sea grass beds and rocky areas. Smaller individuals sometimes inhabit discarded objects, such as jars or cans. They prefer shallow areas near baitfish populations.

== Biology ==
=== Diet ===
The Gulf toadfish is an opportunistic feeder, and feeds on the bottom. They prefer to be near areas supporting baitfish so that they can feed without having to travel far. They also eat marine invertebrates.

=== Calls ===
Like others of the family, Gulf toadfish make mating calls, which may make them vulnerable to predation by dolphins such as bottlenoses; dolphin diets often include sound-producing fish, making up to 80% of their diet, approximately 13% of which are toadfish. In response, Gulf toadfish are able to suppress their calls when detecting dolphins. Their cortisol levels are significantly elevated when exposed to dolphin calls, while the clicks produced by snapping shrimp are ignored as background noise.

=== Toxins ===
Gulf toadfish are commonly believed to be toxic or venomous, but this is untrue. While other members of the batrachoidid family (toadfishes) do have toxic excretions, the Gulf toadfish does not. The purpose of these excretions is still unknown, and, although it can have irritating effects on people and fish, it is not a toxin.

== Relation to humans ==
The Gulf toadfish is commonly considered a trash fish, rarely being eaten. They appear dangerous and slimy, so people refrain from eating them. They will eat anglers' baits readily and prevent them from catching game fish. They will usually eat chunks of bait, especially wide baits, such as cut squid or frozen fish.

They are widely disliked because they have a tendency to swallow hooks, making them difficult to unhook. They also compete with resources for more desirable game fish, and have few predators.
