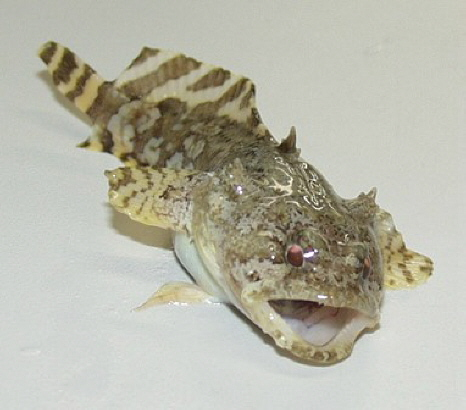
- Opsanus beta

Scientific classification
- Kingdom: Animalia
- Phylum: Chordata
- Class: Actinopterygii
- Order: Batrachoidiformes
- Family: Batrachoididae
- Subfamily: Batrachoidinae
- Genus: Opsanus; Rafinesque, 1818

Type species
- Opsanus cerapalus Rafinesque 1818

= Opsanus =

Opsanus Temporal range: early-mid Miocene to present

Genus of fishes

Opsanus is a genus of toadfishes found in the western Atlantic Ocean. It currently has six recognised species, with the latest one described in 2005.

== Species ==
The recognized species in this genus are:

- Opsanus beta (Goode & T. H. Bean, 1880) (Gulf toadfish)
- Opsanus brasiliensis Rotundo, Spinelli & Zavala-Camin, 2005 (considered by some sources to be a junior synonym of O. tau)
- Opsanus dichrostomus Collette, 2001 (bicolor toadfish)
- Opsanus pardus (Goode & T. H. Bean, 1880) (leopard toadfish)
- Opsanus phobetron Walters & C. R. Robins, 1961 (scarecrow toadfish)
- Opsanus tau (Linnaeus, 1766) (oyster toadfish)

The earliest fossil remains of Opsanus are from the early-to-mid Miocene-aged Choptank Formation of Maryland, US.
