= Apterichtus equatorialis =

Conservation status
- Least Concern (IUCN 3.1)

Scientific classification
- Kingdom: Animalia
- Phylum: Chordata
- Class: Actinopterygii
- Order: Anguilliformes
- Family: Ophichthidae
- Genus: Apterichtus
- Species: A. equatorialis

Binomial name
- Apterichtus equatorialis (G. S. Myers & Wade, 1941)

Synonyms
- Caecula equatorialis G. S. Myers & Wade, 1941; Caecula gymnocelus J. E. Böhlke, 1953; Apterichtus gymnocelus (J. E. Böhlke, 1953)

Species of fish

Apterichtus equatorialis, the finless eel or equatorial eel, is a species of snake eel native to the eastern Pacific Ocean, from the Gulf of California to Panama and around the Galapagos Islands. This species can be found at depths of from 106 to 125 metres (348 to 410 ft) inhabiting areas with bottoms of sand or mud. This species can reach a length of 27 centimetres (11 in) TL.

Due to its wide distribution in the eastern Pacific, a lack of known threats, and a lack of observed population decline, the IUCN redlist currently lists the Finless eel as Least Concern. No conservation actions have been taken specifically for the species, but it inhabits a number of marine protected areas.
