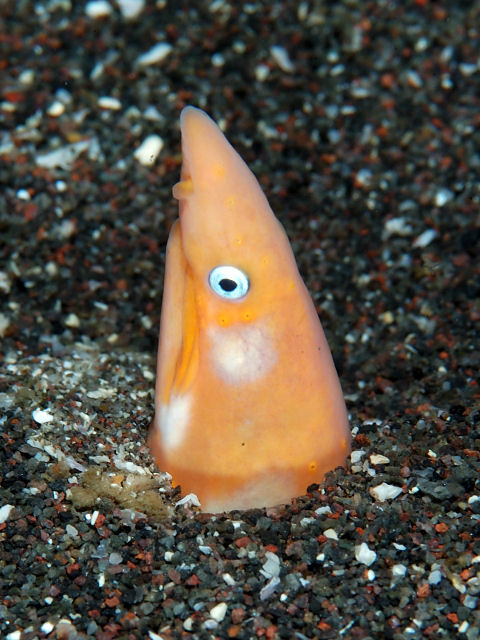

Scientific classification
- Domain: Eukaryota
- Kingdom: Animalia
- Phylum: Chordata
- Class: Actinopterygii
- Order: Anguilliformes
- Family: Ophichthidae
- Genus: Apterichtus
- Species: A. flavicaudus

Binomial name
- Apterichtus flavicaudus (Snyder, 1904)

Synonyms
- Sphagebranchus flavicaudus Snyder, 1904; Apterichtus flavicauda (Snyder, 1904)

= Apterichtus flavicaudus =

Species of fish

Apterichtus flavicaudus, variously known as the orange snake eel, sharpnose sand eel or sharpnose snake eel, is a species of snake eel native to the Indian Ocean from the Seychelles to Hawaii in the Pacific Ocean. It can be found at depths of from 7 to 293 metres (23 to 961 ft) being particularly common in shallow coastal waters with sandy substrates in near vicinity to reefs. This species can reach a length of 80 centimetres (31 in) TL.
