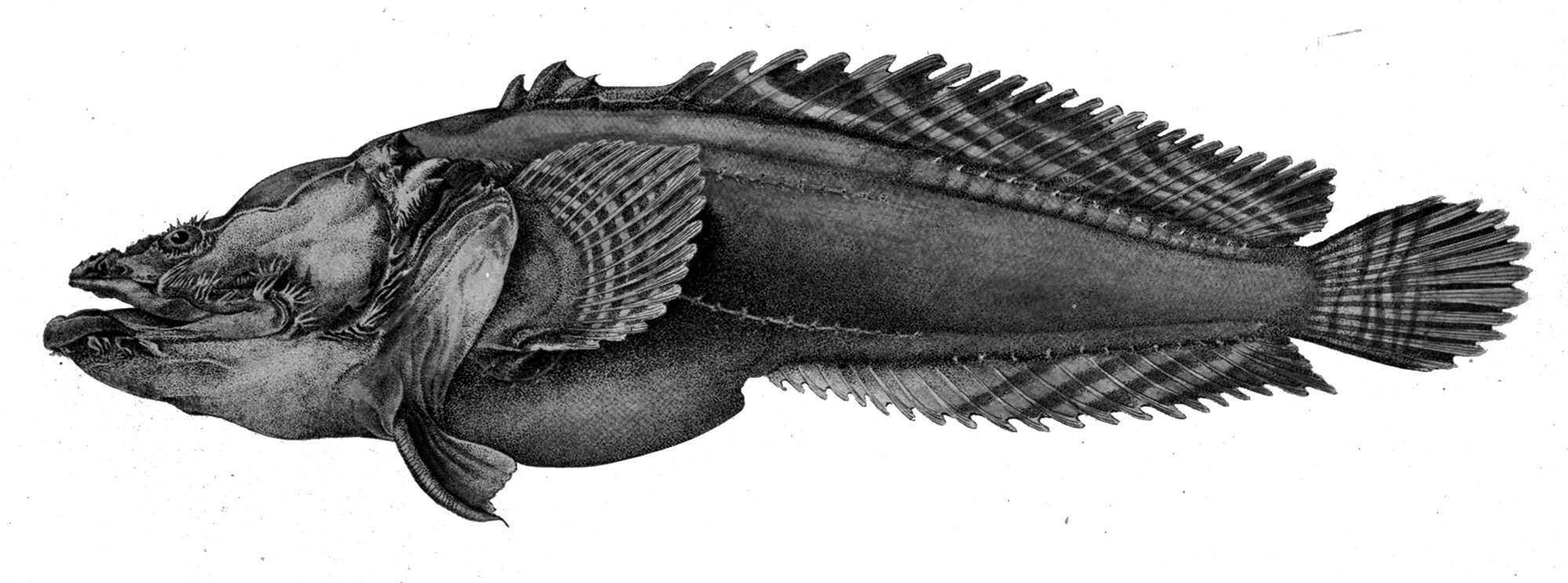
- Batrachoides gilberti

Scientific classification
- Domain: Eukaryota
- Kingdom: Animalia
- Phylum: Chordata
- Class: Actinopterygii
- Order: Batrachoidiformes
- Family: Batrachoididae
- Subfamily: Batrachoidinae; Jordan, 1896

= Batrachoidinae =

Subfamily of fishes

Batrachoidinae is a subfamily of toadfish in the family Batrachoididae. It contains 25 species in the following 6 genera:

- Amphichthys (2 species)
- Batrachoides (9 species)
- Opsanus (6 species)
- Potamobatrachus (1 species)
- Sanopus (6 species)
- Vladichthys (1 species)
