= Apterichtus kendalli =

Scientific classification
- Domain: Eukaryota
- Kingdom: Animalia
- Phylum: Chordata
- Class: Actinopterygii
- Order: Anguilliformes
- Family: Ophichthidae
- Genus: Apterichtus
- Species: A. kendalli

Binomial name
- Apterichtus kendalli (Gilbert, 1891)

Synonyms
- Caecula kendalli Gilbert, 1891; Sphagebranchus kendalli C. H. Gilbert, 1891; Verma kendalli (C. H. Gilbert, 1891)

Species of fish

Apterichtus kendalli, the Western Atlantic finless eel or finless eel, is an eel in the family Ophichthidae (worm/snake eels). It was described by Charles Henry Gilbert in 1891. It is a marine, subtropical eel which is known from the western and eastern Atlantic Ocean, including North Carolina, USA; the western Bahamas, Venezuela, and St. Helena Island. It dwells at a depth range of 3 to 400 metres (9.8 to 1,312.3 ft), and forms burrows in sandy sediments on the continental shelf. Males can reach a maximum total length of 60 centimetres (24 in).

Due to a lack of known major threats to the species, the IUCN redlist currently lists the Western Atlantic finless eel as Least Concern.
