= Charles Roux (biologist) =

French marine biologist

Charles Roux (1920 – c. 2000) was a French marine biologist who was the research director at the Centre oceanographique de Pointe-Noire in the French Congo and in 1987 became a professor and deputy director at the Muséum national d'histoire naturelle in Paris. He attained his doctorate award in 1982 and was the author of a number of papers and books, notably co-writing Ocean Dwellers (Nature's hidden world) with Yves Verbreek. He was one of the six founders of the Société Française d’Ichtyologie in 1976, along with Marie-Louise Bauchot, Jacques Daget, Jean-Claude Hureau, Théodore Monod and Yves Plessis.

== Taxon named in his honor ==
The following fish species have a specific name which honours Roux:

- Enteromius rouxi (Daget 1961)
- The yellowtail sardinella, Sardinella rouxi Poll, 1953
