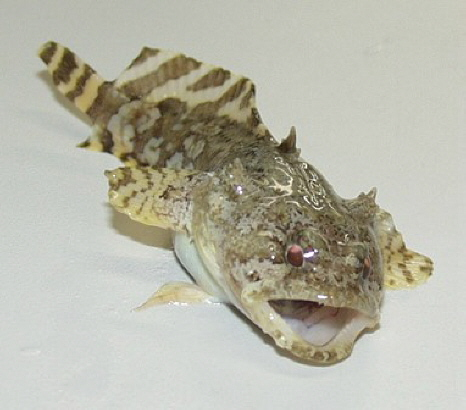
- Gulf toadfish (Opsanus tau)

Scientific classification
- Kingdom: Animalia
- Phylum: Chordata
- Class: Actinopterygii
- Division: Teleostei
- Clade: Percomorpha
- Order: Batrachoidiformes
- Family: Batrachoididae; Jordan, 1896

Type species
- Batrachoides tau Lacépède 1800

Subfamilies
- Batrachoidinae; Halophryninae; Porichthyinae; Thalassophryninae

= Batrachoididae =

Batrachoididae Temporal range: Maastrichtian to recent

Family of ray-finned fishes

Batrachoididae /bætrəˈkɔɪdɪdiː/ is the only family in the ray-finned fish order Batrachoidiformes /bætrəˈkɔɪdɪfɔːrmiːz/. Members of this family are usually called toadfish or frogfish: both the English common name and scientific name refer to their toad-like appearance (batrakhos is Greek for frog).

Toadfish are benthic ambush predators that favor sandy or muddy substrates where their cryptic coloration helps them avoid detection by their prey. Toadfish are well known for their ability to "sing", males in particular using the swim bladder as a sound-production device used to attract mates.

== Evolution ==
Toadfish are among the most basal percomorph orders, and are thought to have diverged from their closest relatives in the Late Cretaceous. The earliest known toadfish is likely Bacchiaichthys from the Late Cretaceous (Maastrichtian) of Italy, which very closely resembles modern toadfish and is one of the earliest known percomorphs. Its status as a toadfish has been disputed, as it is noted to have some traits that differentiate from any extant batrachoidiform, but more recent taxonomic studies continue to retain it as a batrachoidiform. Fossil remains of toadfish are also known in otoliths from the Early Eocene of France, and articulated fossil taxa such as Louckaichthys from the Oligocene of the Czech Republic and Zappaichthys from the Miocene of Austria.

== Description ==
Toadfish are usually scaleless, with eyes set high on large heads. Their mouths are also large, with both a maxilla and premaxilla, and often decorated with barbels and skin flaps. They are generally drab in colour, although those living on coral reefs may have brighter patterns. They range in size from 7.5 cm (3.0 in) length in Thlassophryne megalops, to 57 cm (22 in) in the Pacuma toadfish.

The gills are small and occur only on the sides of the fish. The pelvic fins are forward of the pectoral fins, usually under the gills, and have one spine with several soft rays. For the two separate dorsal fins, the first is smaller with spines, while the second has from 15 to 25 soft rays. The number of vertebrae range from 25 to 47.

Toadfishes of the genus Porichthys, the midshipman fishes, have photophores and four lateral lines. All toadfishes possess sharp spines on the first dorsal fin and on the opercle (gill cover). In fish of the subfamily Thalassophryninae, these are hollow and connect to venom glands capable of delivering a painful wound to predators.

== Distribution and habitat ==
Toadfishes are found worldwide. Most toadfish are marine, though some are found in brackish water and one subfamily, the Thalassophryninae, is found exclusively in freshwater habitats in South America. In particular, Daector quadrizonatus and Thalassophryne amazonica are known from the Atrato River in Colombia and the Amazon River, respectively.

== Habits and reproduction ==
Toadfishes are bottom-dwellers, ranging from near-shore areas to deep waters. They tend to be omnivorous, eating sea worms, crustaceans, mollusks, and other fish. They often hide in rock crevices, among the bottom vegetation, or even dig dens in the bottom sediments, from which they ambush their prey. Toadfish can survive out of water for as long as 24 hours, and some can move across exposed mudflats at low tide using their fins.

Males make nests, and then attract females by "singing", that is, by releasing air by contracting muscles on their swim bladders. The sound has been called a 'hum' or 'whistle', and can be loud enough to be clearly audible from the surface. The eggs are sticky on one side, so the female can attach them to the side of the nest. Each male attracts numerous females to his nest, so the eggs within have multiple mothers.

The male then guards the nest against predators. During this period, the male must survive on a limited supply of food, as he is not able to leave the immediate vicinity to hunt. The eggs rapidly develop into embryos, but these remain attached to the side of the nest until the age of about three to four weeks. After this time, they continue to cluster around and hide behind the male, until they are large enough to fend for themselves. This degree of parental care is very unusual among fishes.

== Genera ==
About 83 species of toadfishes are grouped into 21 genera, as:

Order Batrachoidiformes

- Family Batrachoididae
  - Subfamily Batrachoidinae
    - Genus Amphichthys (two species)
    - Genus Batrachoides (9 species)
    - Genus Opsanus (six species)
    - Genus Potamobatrachus (one species)
    - Genus Sanopus (six species)
    - Genus Vladichthys (one species)
  - Subfamily Halophryninae
    - Genus Allenbatrachus (three species)
    - Genus Austrobatrachus (two species)
    - Genus Barchatus (one species)
    - Genus Batrachomoeus (five species)
    - Genus Batrichthys (two species)
    - Genus Bifax (one species)
    - Genus Chatrabus (three species)
    - Genus Colletteichthys (three species)
    - Genus Halobatrachus (one species)
    - Genus Halophryne (four species)
    - Genus Perulibatrachus (three species)
    - Genus Riekertia (one species)
    - Genus Triathalassothia (two species)
  - Subfamily Porichthyinae
    - Genus Aphos (one species)
    - Genus Porichthys - midshipmen (14 species)
  - Subfamily Thalassophryninae
    - Genus Daector (five species)
    - Genus Thalassophryne (six species)

== Economics ==
Toadfish are not normally commercially exploited, but they are taken by local fishermen as a food fish, and by trawlers where they usually end up as a source of fishmeal and oil. Some smaller toadfish from brackish-water habitats have been exported as freshwater aquarium fishes.

The western Atlantic species Opsanus tau, known as the oyster toadfish, is quite widely used as a research animal, while a few species, most notably Thalassophryne amazonica, are occasionally kept as aquarium fish.

== See also ==
- List of fish common names
- List of fish families
