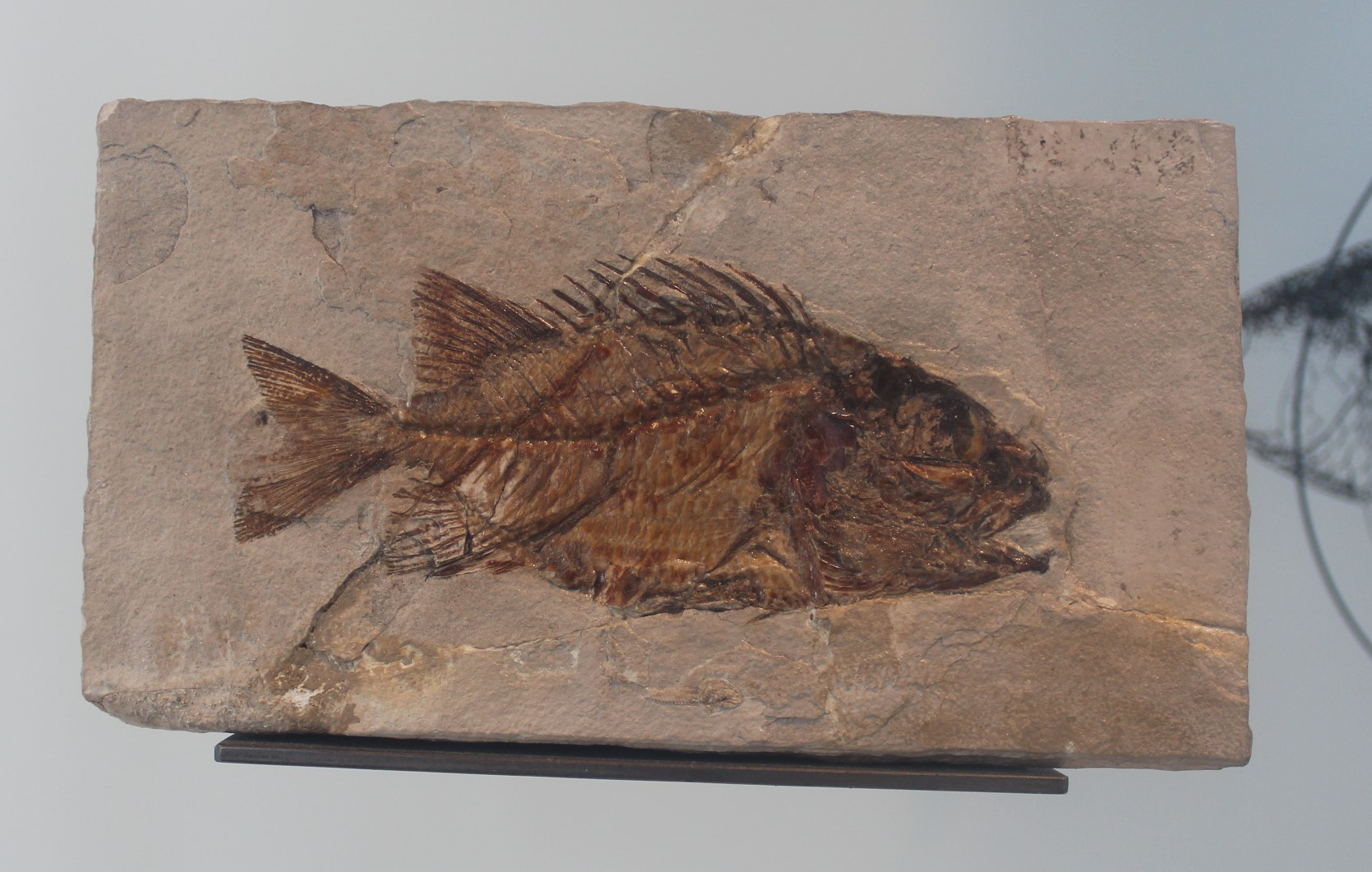
- E. macrocephalum fossil, American Museum of Natural History

Scientific classification
- Kingdom: Animalia
- Phylum: Chordata
- Class: Actinopterygii
- Division: Teleostei
- Order: Beryciformes
- Family: Holocentridae
- Subfamily: Holocentrinae
- Genus: †Eoholocentrum; Sorbini & Tirapelle, 1975
- Species: †E. macrocephalum

Binomial name
- †Eoholocentrum macrocephalum (de Blainville, 1818)

Synonyms
- Holocentrum macrocephalum de Blainville, 1818; Gillidia antiquua (Agassiz, 1833)

= Eoholocentrum =

Eoholocentrum Temporal range: Early Eocene

Extinct genus of fishes

Eoholocentrum ("dawn Holocentrum") is an extinct genus of prehistoric marine ray-finned fish that lived during the early Eocene. It contains a single species, E. macrocephalum, known from the Early Eocene of Monte Bolca, Italy. It resembled and was closely related to modern squirrelfishes and soldierfishes, and appears to have been more closely related to squirrelfishes. It can be considered a basal or stem member of the Holocentrinae.

It was originally erroneously named by Volta (1796) as a fossil specimen of "Holocentrus sogo" (a synonym for Holocentrus adscensionis) and then as a specimen of "Chaetodon saxatilis" (a synonym for Abudefduf saxatilis). It was described as its own species in Holocentrus by de Blainville (1818) before being placed in its own genus in 1975. The alleged percomorph species Gillidia antiquua (Agassiz, 1833) is likely also synonymous with Eoholocentrum.

== See also ==
- Prehistoric fish
- List of prehistoric bony fish
