= Sargocentron megalops =

Conservation status
- Data Deficient (IUCN 3.1)

Scientific classification
- Domain: Eukaryota
- Kingdom: Animalia
- Phylum: Chordata
- Class: Actinopterygii
- Order: Beryciformes
- Family: Holocentridae
- Genus: Sargocentron
- Species: S. megalops

Binomial name
- Sargocentron megalops (Randall, 1998)

Species of Fish

Sargocentron megalops is a species of squirrelfish belonging to the genus of Sargocentron. It is endemic to Pitcairn in the Central Pacific Ocean. It possesses unusually large eyes, which it is named after, and is thought to be used for penetrating deeper water, suggesting 49m could be the near upper limit of the depth range of where it is found.
