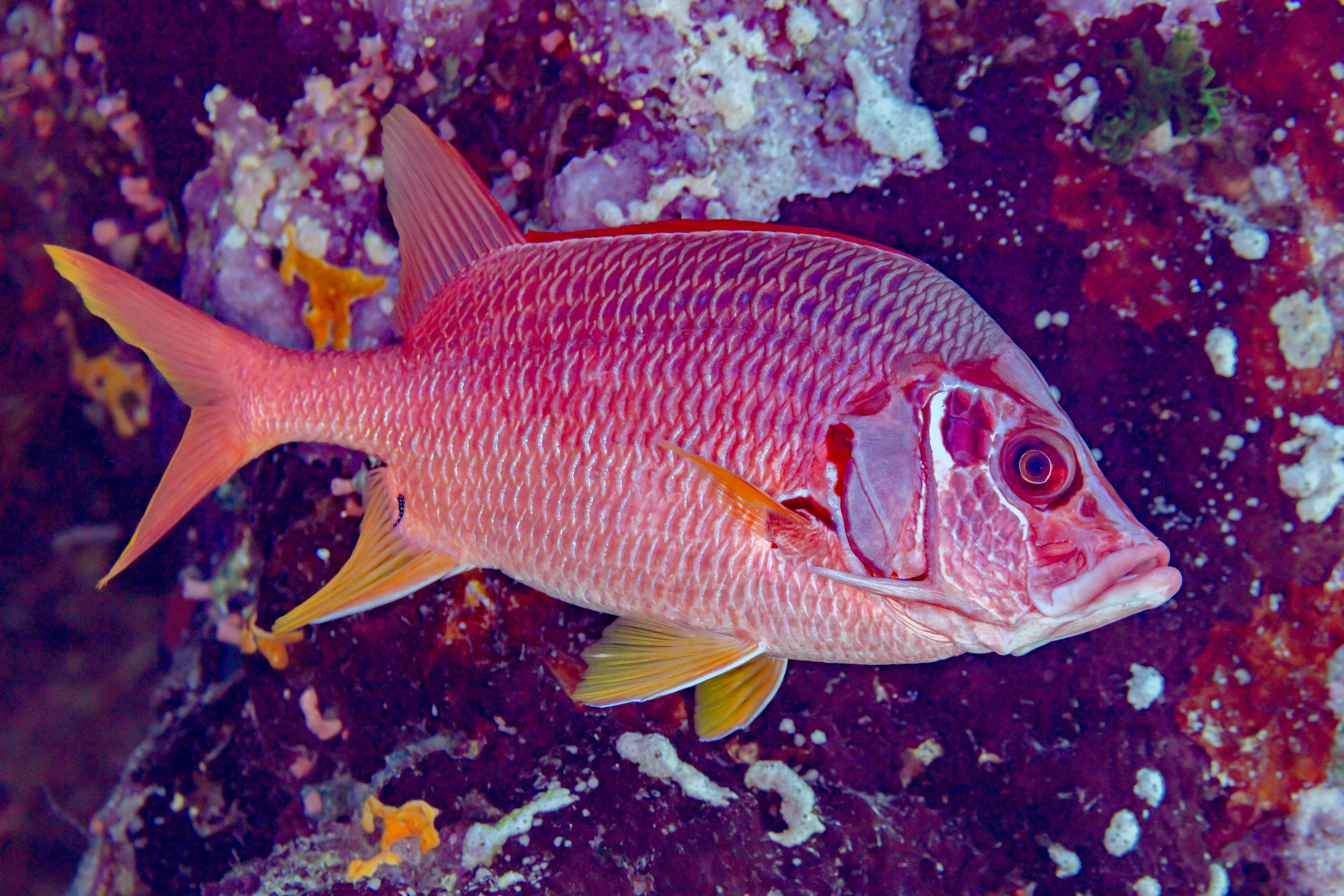
- Sargocentron spiniferum in the Red Sea

Conservation status
- Least Concern (IUCN 3.1)

Scientific classification
- Kingdom: Animalia
- Phylum: Chordata
- Class: Actinopterygii
- Order: Beryciformes
- Family: Holocentridae
- Genus: Sargocentron
- Species: S. spiniferum

Binomial name
- Sargocentron spiniferum (Forsskål, 1775)

Synonyms
- Sciaena spinifera Forsskål, 1775; Adioryx spinifer (Forsskål, 1775); Holocentrum leo Cuvier, 1829; Holocentrum binotatum Quoy & Gaimard, 1834; Holocentrum melanopterus Bleeker, 1855; Holocentrum unipunctatum Günther, 1874; Holocentrus bowiei Jordan & Snyder, 1905; Holocentrus verticalis Seale, 1906; Holocentrus xanthurus Fowler, 1944

= Sargocentron spiniferum =

Species of fish

Sargocentron spiniferum, common name sabre squirrelfish, giant squirrelfish and spiny squirrelfish, is a large Indo-Pacific species of squirrelfish belonging to the family Holocentridae.

== Description ==
Sargocentron spiniferum is the largest squirrelfish in its range and can reach up to 51 cm (20 in) in length and 2.6 kg (5.7 lb) in weight (the Atlantic Holocentrus adscensionis can surpass the length, but it is slimmer). A more common length for S. spiniferum is 35 cm (14 in). The body is oval and laterally compressed. The head has a pointed snout and large eyes, being largely nocturnal. The basic colour is bright red. It has silver scale margins, a spinous dorsal fin and a large deep red patch just behind the eyes. The lower jaw protrudes beyond the upper jaw. It bears a very long preopercle spine (near the gill-opening). The anal and ventral fins are yellowish. The caudal fin is clearly bifid.

== Distribution ==
This species is widespread throughout the tropical Indo-Pacific, from the Red Sea and Indian Ocean up to Hawaii, Japan and southern Australia.

== Habitat ==
This squirrelfish can be found in tropical waters on coral reefs, from shallow water to a depth of 120 m (390 ft).
