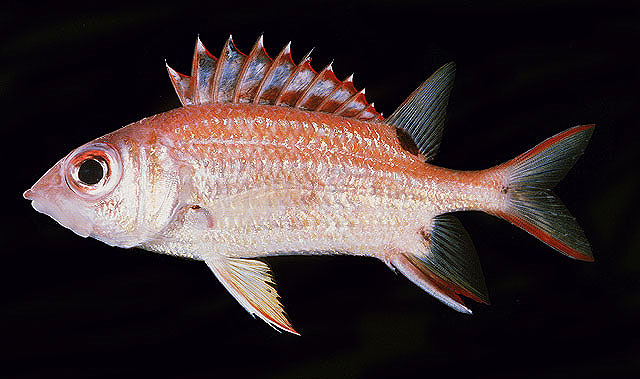

Conservation status
- Least Concern (IUCN 3.1)

Scientific classification
- Domain: Eukaryota
- Kingdom: Animalia
- Phylum: Chordata
- Class: Actinopterygii
- Order: Beryciformes
- Family: Holocentridae
- Genus: Sargocentron
- Species: S. melanospilos

Binomial name
- Sargocentron melanospilos Bleeker, 1858

Synonyms
- Holocentrum melanospilos Beeker,1858

= Sargocentron melanospilos =

Blackblotch squirrelfish

Species of fish

Sargocentron melanospilos, the blackbotch squirrelfish, is a species of squirrelfish in the genus of Sargocentron. It is found in the Indo-Pacific region in the Red Sea; Zanzibar, Tanzania; from Aldabra and Seychelles to the Marshall Islands and American Samoa; north to Taiwan, southern Japan and the Ogasawara Islands, and south to the southern Great Barrier Reef and the Chesterfield Islands. It is a relatively uncommon inhabitant of rocky reefs and coral-rich areas, and is usually seen solitary, but it also forms schools when in deeper water or oceanic areas.
