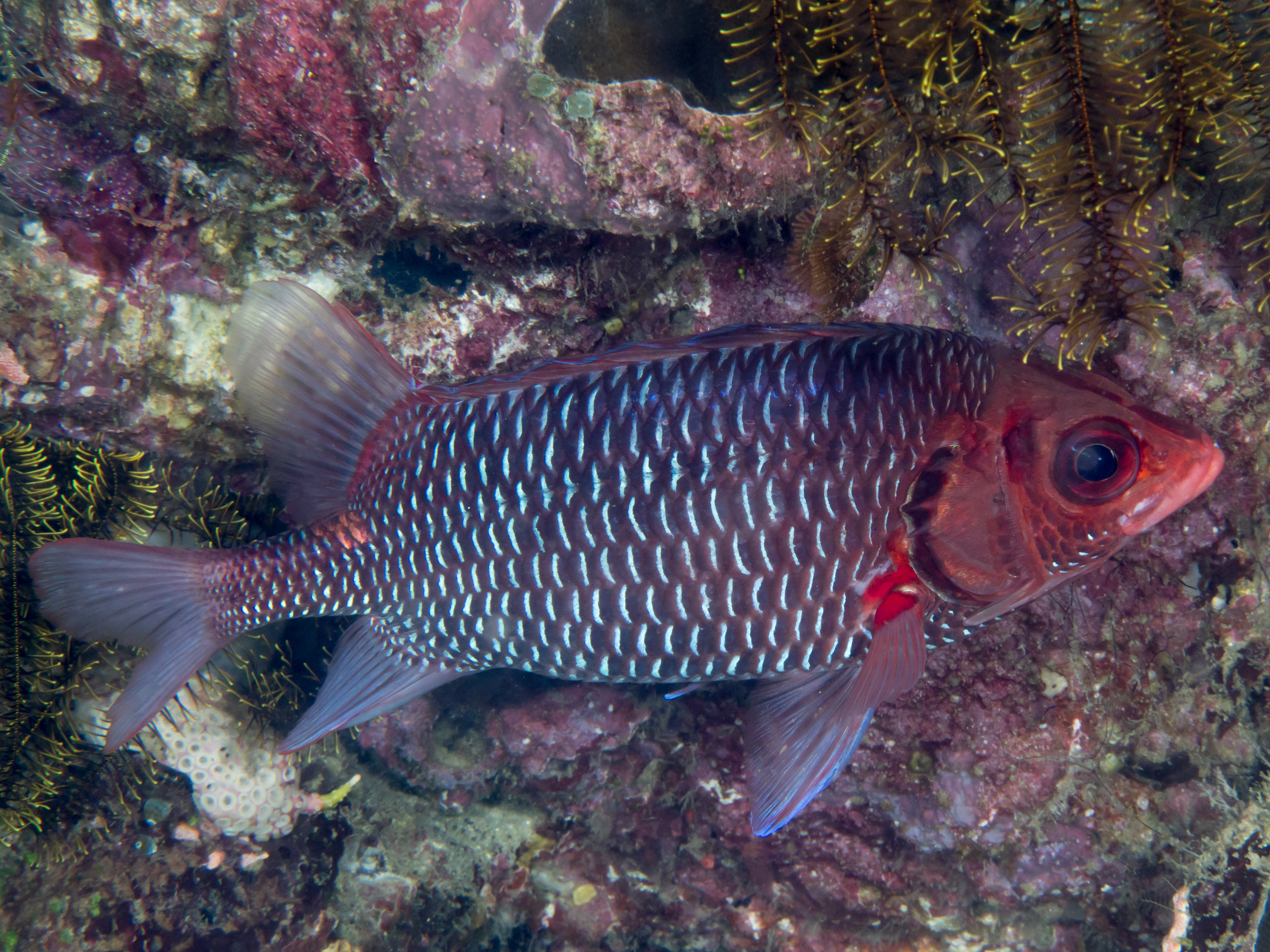

Conservation status
- Least Concern (IUCN 3.1)

Scientific classification
- Domain: Eukaryota
- Kingdom: Animalia
- Phylum: Chordata
- Class: Actinopterygii
- Order: Beryciformes
- Family: Holocentridae
- Genus: Sargocentron
- Species: S. violaceum

Binomial name
- Sargocentron violaceum (Bleeker, 1853)

Synonyms
- Adioryx violaceus Bleeker, 1853; Holocentrum violaceus Bleeker, 1853

= Sargocentron violaceum =

Species of fish

Sargocentron violaceum, the violet squirrelfish, is a nocturnal species of squirrelfish in the genus Sargocentron. It can be found in the Indian Ocean and the Pacific Ocean from Aldabra and the Laccadive Islands to the Society Islands, north to Ryukyu, Japan, south to the southern Great Barrier Reef, and from Palau to the eastern Caroline and Marshall Islands in Micronesia. It is an uncommon inhabitant atoll reef flats, lagoon patch reefs, and steep outer reef slopes. It is a solitary and secretive species and can occasionally be seen in small crevices in clear water habitats. It is usually among rich coral growth and it mainly feeds on benthic crabs and shrimps.
