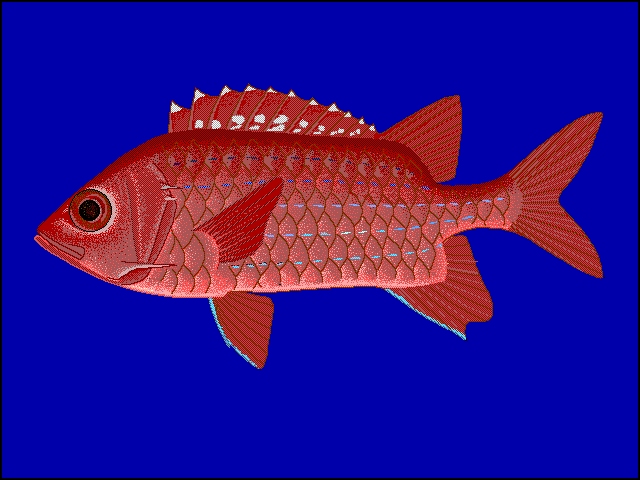
- Drawing of Sargocentron tiere

Scientific classification
- Kingdom: Animalia
- Phylum: Chordata
- Class: Actinopterygii
- Order: Beryciformes
- Family: Holocentridae
- Genus: Sargocentron
- Species: S. tiere

Binomial name
- Sargocentron tiere (G. Cuvier, 1829)

= Sargocentron tiere =

Species of fish

Sargocentron tiere is a species of squirrelfish in the genus Sargocentron, native to the Indo-Pacific. It inhabits coral reef and rocky coastal environments, where it typically shelters in crevices during the day. Like other squirrelfishes, it is primarily nocturnal, emerging at night to feed on small crustaceans and other invertebrates. The species is distinguished by its reddish body marked with blue horizontal lines and its large eyes, an adaptation to low-light conditions. It occasionally appears in the aquarium trade and can grow to 33 centimetres (13 in) in length.

== Distribution ==
This species is found around the Hawaiian Islands and more broadly across the Indo-Pacific region. Its habitat includes coral reef margins and outer reef slopes, where it occupies caves, ledges, and other sheltered areas.
