= Sargocentron shimizui =

Scientific classification
- Domain: Eukaryota
- Kingdom: Animalia
- Phylum: Chordata
- Class: Actinopterygii
- Order: Beryciformes
- Family: Holocentridae
- Genus: Sargocentron
- Species: S. shimizui

Binomial name
- Sargocentron shimizui (J. E. Randall, 1998)

Species of Fish

Sargocentron shimuzui, or Shimizu's squirrelfish, is a species of squirrelfish belonging to the genus of Sargocentron. It is named after ichthyologist Takeshi Shimizu. It is known from only 2 specimens that were taken with dynamite in Sulawesi, Indonesia in 1909.
