= Sargocentron poco =

Conservation status
- Least Concern (IUCN 3.1)

Scientific classification
- Domain: Eukaryota
- Kingdom: Animalia
- Phylum: Chordata
- Class: Actinopterygii
- Order: Beryciformes
- Family: Holocentridae
- Genus: Sargocentron
- Species: S. poco

Binomial name
- Sargocentron poco (Woods, 1965)

Synonyms
- Holocentrus poco Woods, 1965; Adioryx poco Woods, 1965

Species of Fish

Sargocentron poco, the saddle squirrelfish, is a species of squirrelfish belonging to the genus of Sargocentron. It is found in the Western Central Atlantic Ocean from the United States to the Cayman Islands, and in the Bahamas. It may also possibly be found in Cuba. It is likely to be more commonly found inhabiting shelf-edge reefs.
