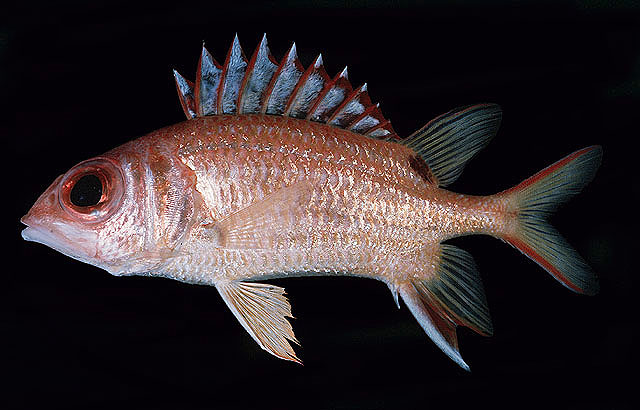

Scientific classification
- Domain: Eukaryota
- Kingdom: Animalia
- Phylum: Chordata
- Class: Actinopterygii
- Order: Beryciformes
- Family: Holocentridae
- Genus: Sargocentron
- Species: S. marisrubri

Binomial name
- Sargocentron marisrubri (J. E. Randall, Golani & Diamant, 1984)

= Sargocentron marisrubri =

Species of Fish

Sargocentron marisrubri is a species of squirrelfish belonging to the genus of Sargocentron. It can be found in the West Indian Ocean in Egypt in the Gulf of Aqaba, also known as the Gulf of Elat, and in Sudan. It can be found in reefs in small aggregations.
