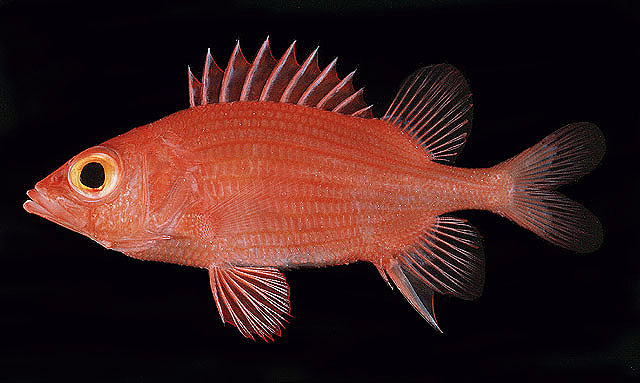

Conservation status
- Least Concern (IUCN 3.1)

Scientific classification
- Domain: Eukaryota
- Kingdom: Animalia
- Phylum: Chordata
- Class: Actinopterygii
- Order: Beryciformes
- Family: Holocentridae
- Genus: Sargocentron
- Species: S. lepros

Binomial name
- Sargocentron lepros G. R. Allen & N. J. Cross

Synonyms
- Adioryx lepros G. R. Allen & N. J. Cross

= Sargocentron lepros =

Species of fish

Sargocentron lepros, the spiny squirrelfish, is a nocturnal species of squirrelfish belonging to the genus of Sargocentron. It inhabits the outer reef slopes of oceanic islands, mostly in the Southern Pacific Ocean. It is normally found solitary.
