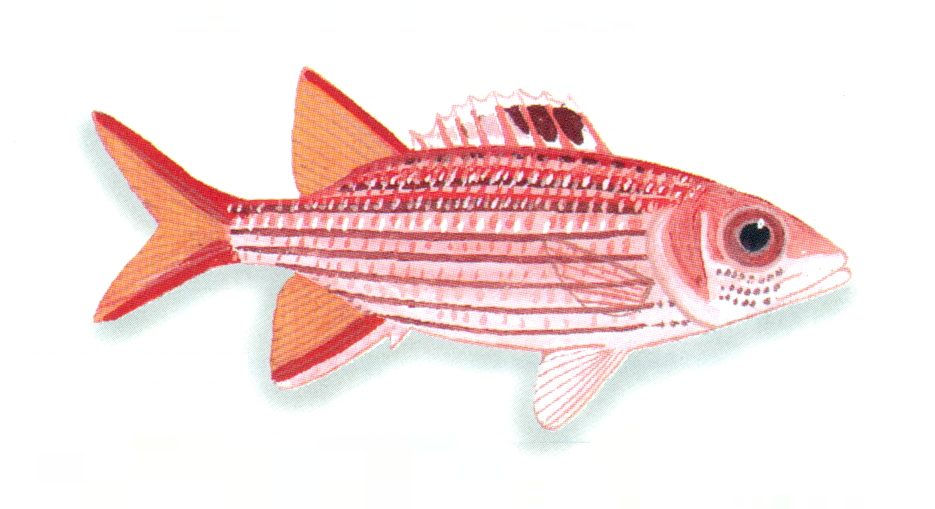

Conservation status
- Least Concern (IUCN 3.1)

Scientific classification
- Domain: Eukaryota
- Kingdom: Animalia
- Phylum: Chordata
- Class: Actinopterygii
- Order: Beryciformes
- Family: Holocentridae
- Genus: Sargocentron
- Species: S. dorsomaculatum

Binomial name
- Sargocentron dorsomaculatum (Shimizu & Yamakawa, 1979)

Synonyms
- Adioryx dorsomaculatus Shimizu & Yamakawa, 1979

= Sargocentron dorsomaculatum =

Species of fish

Sargocentron dorsomaculatum, also known as the spotfin squirrelfish, is a species of squirrelfish found in the western Pacific Ocean near the Ryukyu Islands, Pohnpei, Kosrae, the Caroline Islands, and Palau. It lives in shallow reefs at depths between 2 and 9 metres (6.6 and 29.5 ft). Like other members of its genus, it is nocturnal and seeks shelter among corals and other structures. It can reach sizes of up to 19.7 centimetres (7.8 in) SL.
