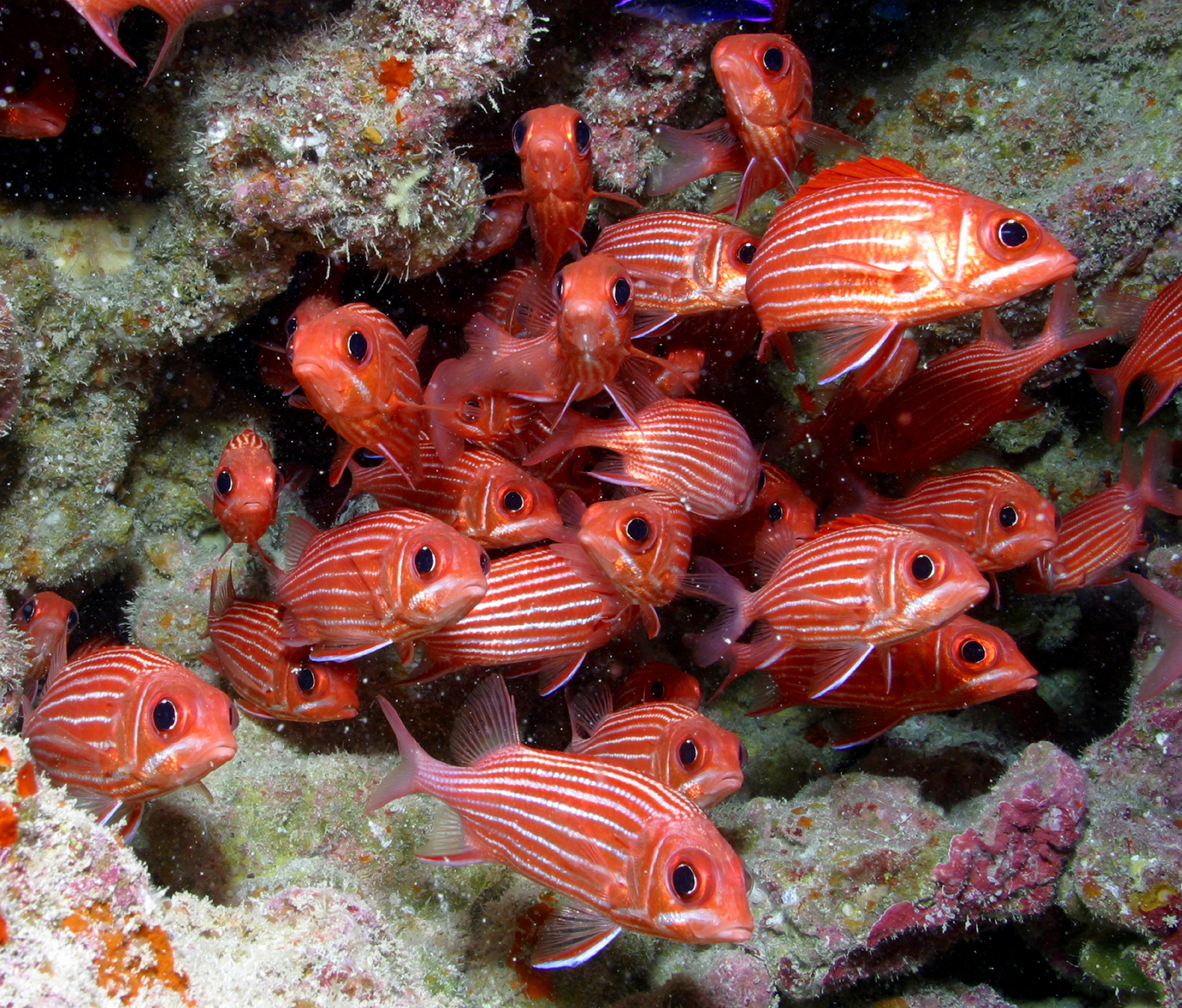

Conservation status
- Least Concern (IUCN 3.1)

Scientific classification
- Kingdom: Animalia
- Phylum: Chordata
- Class: Actinopterygii
- Order: Beryciformes
- Family: Holocentridae
- Genus: Sargocentron
- Species: S. xantherythrum

Binomial name
- Sargocentron xantherythrum (D. S. Jordan & Evermann, 1903)

Synonyms
- Holocentrus xantherythrus Jordan & Evermann, 1903

= Sargocentron xantherythrum =

Species of fish

Sargocentron xantherythrum, commonly known as Hawaiian squirrelfish or striped squirrelfish, is a member of the squirrelfish family. It is known from the Hawaiian Islands and Johnston Atoll. It is occasionally available in the aquarium trade. It grows to a total length of 17 centimeters (6.7 in).

== Description ==
This fish has a red coloration with white stripes running along the body. It has sharp gill spines and rough scales that can cause the fish to be snagged in netting materials.

== Distribution and habitat ==
Sargocentron xantherythrum is usually found in reefs in tropical climates and lives in depths of 1–217 m (3 ft 3 in – 711 ft 11 in).

== Behavior ==
This is a nocturnal species that inhabits seaward reefs below the surge zone, and is common near caves and ledges. It feeds mainly on worms, crustaceans and starfish.
