= Sargocentron wilhelmi =

Scientific classification
- Kingdom: Animalia
- Phylum: Chordata
- Class: Actinopterygii
- Order: Beryciformes
- Family: Holocentridae
- Genus: Sargocentron
- Species: S. wilhelmi

Binomial name
- Sargocentron wilhelmi (F. de Buen, 1963)

Synonyms
- Holocentrum wilhelmi F. de buen, 1853

Species of fish

Sargocentron wilhelmi, or Wilhelm's squirrelfish, is a species of squirrelfish belonging to the genus Sargocentron. It is named after ichthyologist Friedrich Wilhelm. It is endemic to Easter Island in the Southeast Pacific Ocean.
