= Sargocentron tiereoides =

Conservation status
- Least Concern (IUCN 3.1)

Scientific classification
- Domain: Eukaryota
- Kingdom: Animalia
- Phylum: Chordata
- Class: Actinopterygii
- Order: Beryciformes
- Family: Holocentridae
- Genus: Sargocentron
- Species: S. tiereoides

Binomial name
- Sargocentron tiereoides (Bleeker, 1853)

Synonyms
- Adioryx tiereoides Bleeker, 1853; Holocentrum tiereoides Bleeker, 1853

Species of fish

Sargocentron tiereoides, the pink squirrelfish, is a species of squirrelfish belonging to the genus Sargocentron. It can be found in the Indian Ocean and the Pacific Ocean, from East Africa to the Line and Society Islands, north to Ryukyu, Japan and Wake Island, south to Vanuatu, through Micronesia. It inhabits outer reef slopes of deeper waters and has been collected on reef flat and lagoon patch reefs. It feeds on benthic crabs and shrimp at night.
