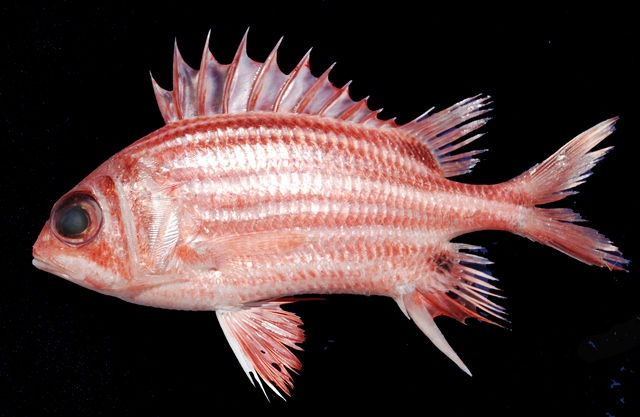

Conservation status
- Least Concern (IUCN 3.1)

Scientific classification
- Domain: Eukaryota
- Kingdom: Animalia
- Phylum: Chordata
- Class: Actinopterygii
- Order: Beryciformes
- Family: Holocentridae
- Genus: Sargocentron
- Species: S. praslin

Binomial name
- Sargocentron praslin (Lacépède, 1802)

Synonyms
- Perca praslin Lacépède, 1802; Holocentrum marginatum Culver, 1829

= Sargocentron praslin =

Species of fish

Sargocentron praslin, the dark-striped squirrelfish, is a species of squirrelfish belonging to the genus Sargocentron. It can be found in the Indian Ocean and the West Pacific Ocean, from East Africa south to Mozambique and east to the Marshall Islands excluding the northern Marshall Islands and the Society Islands. It has also been introduced into Libya, Turkey and Cyprus and may also possibly be found in Egypt and Greece. It inhabits reef flats and shallow protected reefs, often in dead reef areas. It is secretive during the day.
