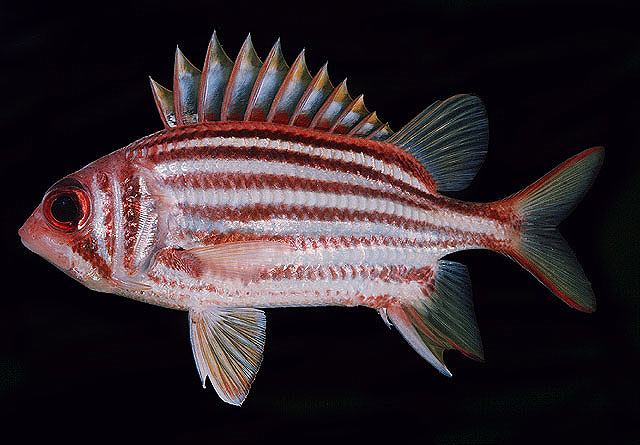

Scientific classification
- Domain: Eukaryota
- Kingdom: Animalia
- Phylum: Chordata
- Class: Actinopterygii
- Order: Beryciformes
- Family: Holocentridae
- Genus: Sargocentron
- Species: S. seychellense

Binomial name
- Sargocentron seychellense (J. L. B. Smith & M. M. Smith, 1963)

Synonyms
- Holocentrus seychellensis J. L. B. Smith & M. M. Smith, 1963; Centropomus ruber Lacépède, 1802

= Sargocentron seychellense =

Species of fish

Sargocentron seychellense, the yellow-tipped squirrelfish, is a species of squirrelfish belonging to the genus Sargocentron. It is found in the Western Indian Ocean in Oman, the St. Brandon Shoals, Yemen in the Socotra Archipelago, Mauritius, Réunion, Comoros, Madagascar, the Chagos Archipelago and Seychelles, which it is named after. It inhabits shallow waters of coral reefs and rocky shores, and is often found between branching corals.
