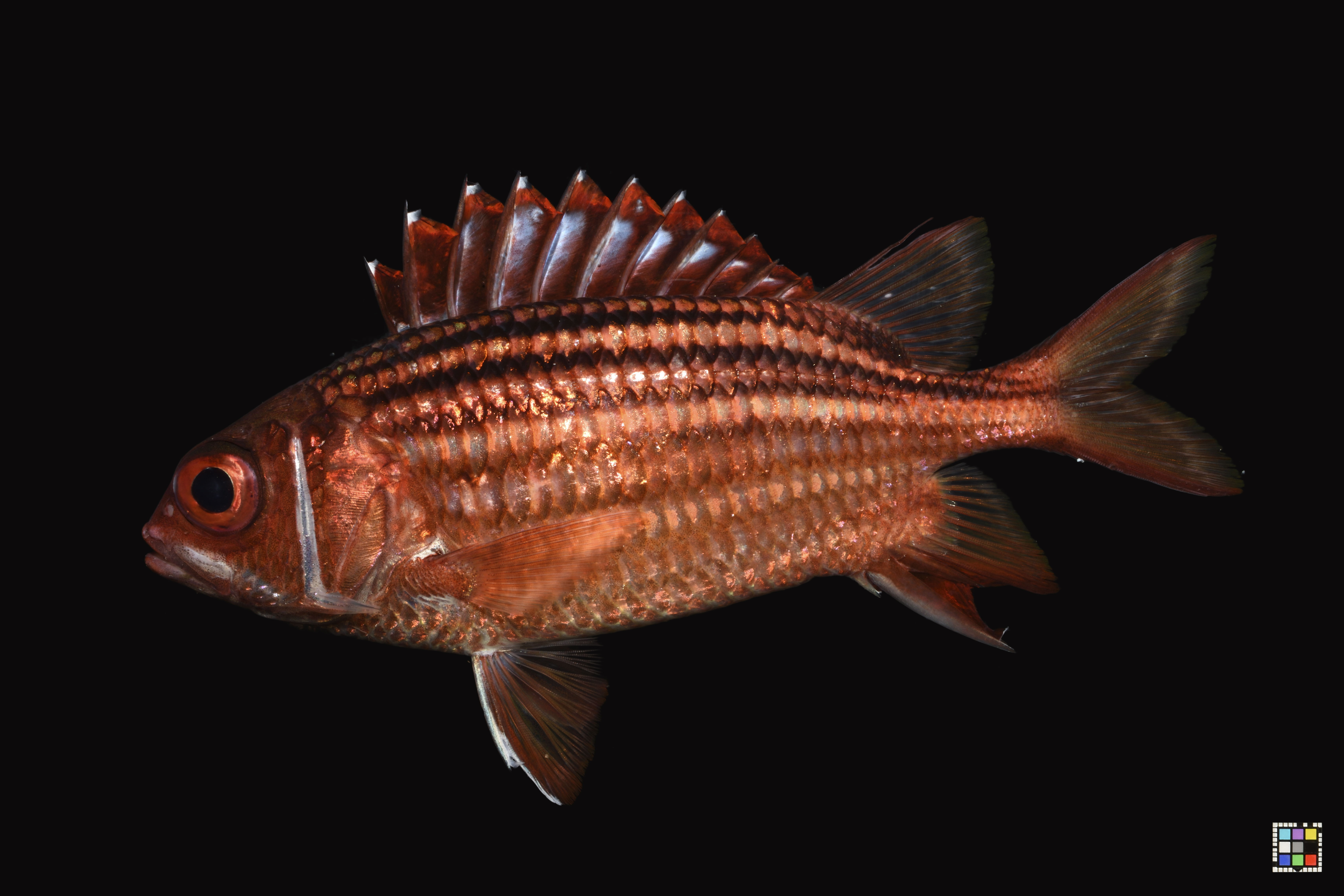

Conservation status
- Least Concern (IUCN 3.1)

Scientific classification
- Domain: Eukaryota
- Kingdom: Animalia
- Phylum: Chordata
- Class: Actinopterygii
- Order: Beryciformes
- Family: Holocentridae
- Genus: Sargocentron
- Species: S. ittodai

Binomial name
- Sargocentron ittodai (D.S. Jordan & Fowler, 1902)

Synonyms
- Holocentrus ittodai Jordan & Fowler, 1902; Adioryx ittodai Jordan & Fowler, 1902

= Sargocentron ittodai =

Species of fish

Sargocentron ittodai, the samurai squirrelfish, is a nocturnal species of squirrelfish belonging to the genus of Sargocentron. It is found in the Indo-Pacific region, in the Red Sea and Natal, from South Africa to the Marquesan Islands, and north from Southern Japan and the Ogasawara Islands, south to New South Wales, Australia. It inhabits outer reef slopes. It can be found either solitary or in groups. It mainly feeds on benthic crabs and shrimps.
