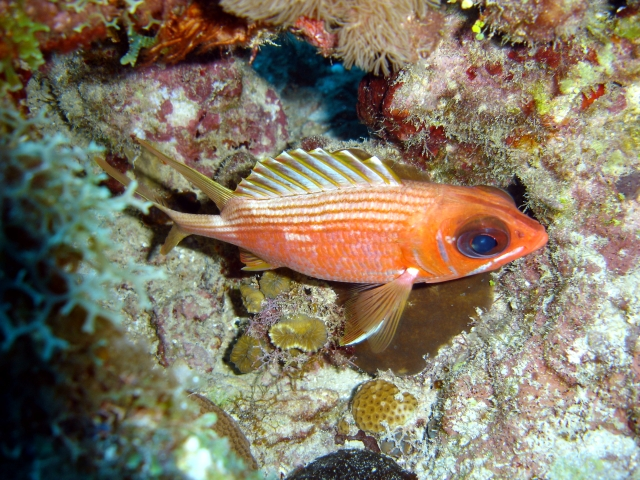

Conservation status
- Least Concern (IUCN 3.1)

Scientific classification
- Kingdom: Animalia
- Phylum: Chordata
- Class: Actinopterygii
- Division: Teleostei
- Order: Beryciformes
- Family: Holocentridae
- Genus: Holocentrus
- Species: H. rufus

Binomial name
- Holocentrus rufus (Walbaum, 1792)

= Longspine squirrelfish =

Holocentrus rufus

Species of fish

The longspine squirrelfish (Holocentrus rufus) is a silvery red, sea fish with orange-gold body stripes. One of about 150 species of squirrelfish, their most distinguishing characteristics are their large eyes and the long third spine of the anal fin. It is often included in public aquarium displays. The length of the longspine squirrelfish is about 18 cm (7.8 inches). It lives in coral reefs in tropical and warm temperate seas and eats zoobenthos. It is territorial and uses sounds called "grunts" and "staccatos" to defend its crevice, warn of danger and, in groups, intimidate predators such as the moray eel. The longspine squirrelfish is edible and harvested on a small scale.

== Identification ==
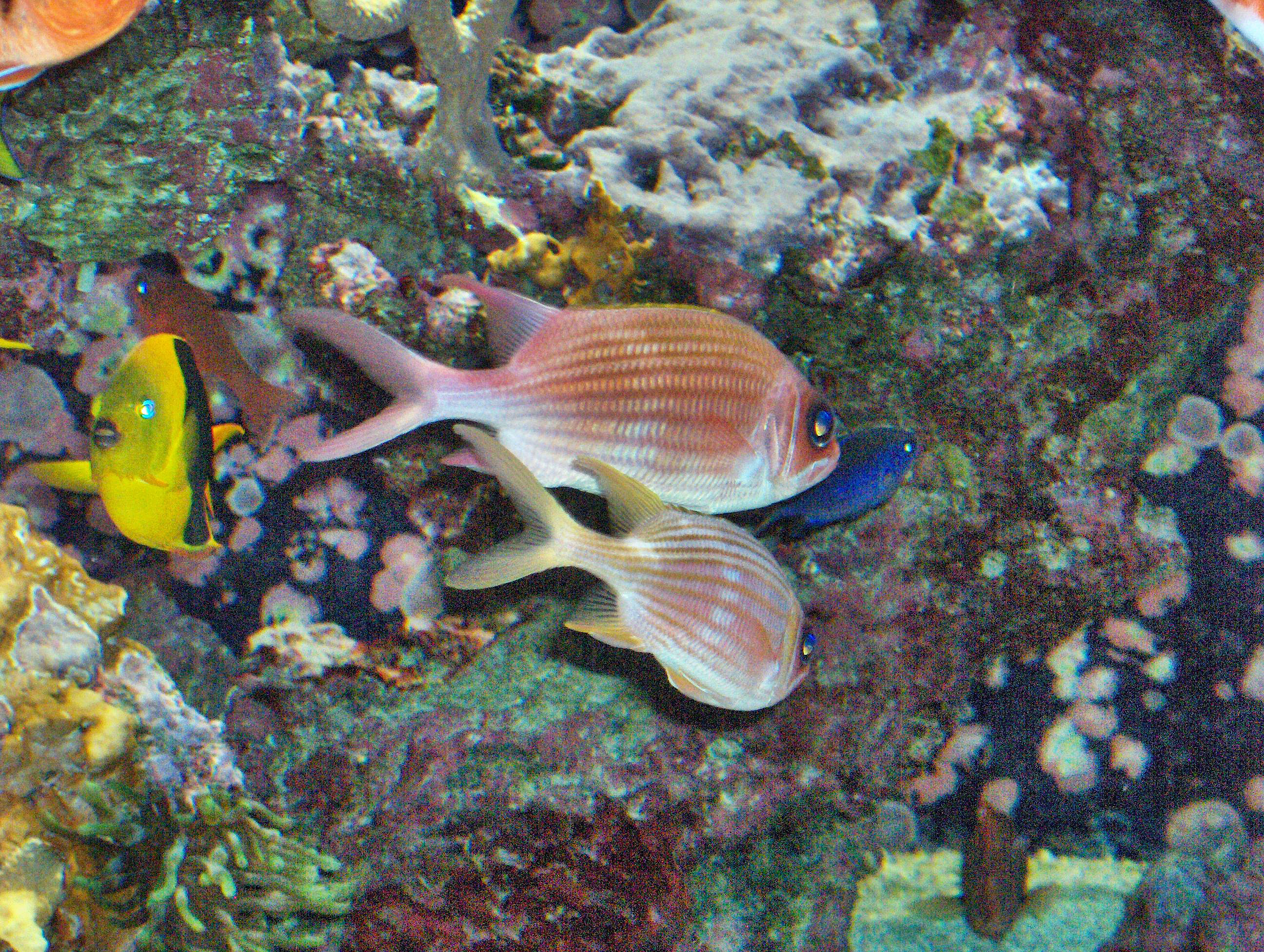
Longspine squirrelfish (Holocentrus rufus); Musée Océanographique de Monaco, photo by Georges Jansoone

The body of the longspine squirrelfish is silvery red, with orange-gold body stripes. Its eyes are very large, which is characteristic of all squirrelfish. The rear dorsal fin is pronounced and sticks up. The anal fin has a strongly elongated third spine, from which this squirrelfish gets its name.

There are about 150 species of squirrelfish. Squirrelfish, belonging to the order of Beryciformes, are brightly colored, medium-sized fish that are active during the night. Squirrelfish live in rocky or coral reefs in tropical and warm-temperate seas. Their most distinguishing characteristics are their large eyes. To identify the longspine squirrelfish, in addition to recognizing the long third spine of the anal fin, it can be useful to pay attention to the specific anatomy of other fins:

Feature	Number
Dorsal spines	11
Dorsal soft rays	14-16
Anal spines	4
Anal soft rays	9-11

== Distribution ==
Longspine squirrelfish are marine fish that live in coral reefs. The length of the longspine squirrelfish is up to 18 cm (7.8 inches). They are found along the south eastern coast of the United States to Northern South America and Brazil, as well as in-between locations such as Bermuda and the West Indies. They hide in or near dark recesses. They are territorial and defend their crevices with visual and acoustic displays. They are rare on shallow reefs. They are more abundant with increasing depth and are most abundant between thirty and seventy meters.

The juveniles are thin, silvery pelagics and seldom seen.

== Food ==
Most of the food longspine squirrelfish eat is zoobenthos, including crustaceans, mollusks, and gastropods. It tends to guard its territory during the day and feed more actively at night.

== Sounds ==
Vocalization has been described in 30 families of fishes. Aggressive sounds tend to be middle-frequency (about one kHz). Distressed sounds can be a bit higher frequency (about 6 kHz). Longspine squirrelfish make two kinds of sounds, a single "grunt" and a short burst of sounds called a "staccato." The grunt sounds are used mostly to defend their territory. The staccato sound indicates alarm. Other longspine squirrelfish hearing the staccato sound will first retreat into their crevices, then come out to investigate the threat. Sometimes several of them make staccato sounds to scare away predators like the moray eel. This behavior is called "mobbing." Researchers have observed that the longspine squirrelfish makes sounds more frequently at dusk.

== Importance to humans ==
Squirrelfish in general are of low commercial importance, but they are frequently taken on a small scale off of Brazil and Venezuela with traps, handlines, and gillnets. They show resilience through the ability to survive for days within traps and to survive in highly polluted waters. They are sometimes marketed fresh. They are commonly displayed in public aquarium facilities due to their beautiful red coloration and distinctively large eyes.

In a 1980 study, longspine squirrelfish were determined to be quite edible among 16 different species of finfish obtainable off of the South Carolina coast of the United States. A taste panel of thirteen individuals gave it high marks for firmness, average marks for flavor, and lower marks for flakiness compared with other species sampled. It was judged to be most similar to the short bigeye and the (much larger) red drum.
