= Sargocentron inaequalis =

Conservation status
- Data Deficient (IUCN 3.1)

Scientific classification
- Kingdom: Animalia
- Phylum: Chordata
- Class: Actinopterygii
- Order: Beryciformes
- Family: Holocentridae
- Genus: Sargocentron
- Species: S. inaequalis

Binomial name
- Sargocentron inaequalis (J.E. Randall & Heemstra, 1985)

Species of fish

Sargocentron inaequalis, the lattice squirrelfish, also known as the roundfinned squirrelfish, is a species of squirrelfish in the genus of Sargocentron. It is found in the Indian Ocean in the Chagos Archipelago, Comoro Islands, Seychelles and Réunion, and in the Pacific Ocean in the Line Islands in Kiribati. It is an uncommon inhabitant of rocky coral reefs.
