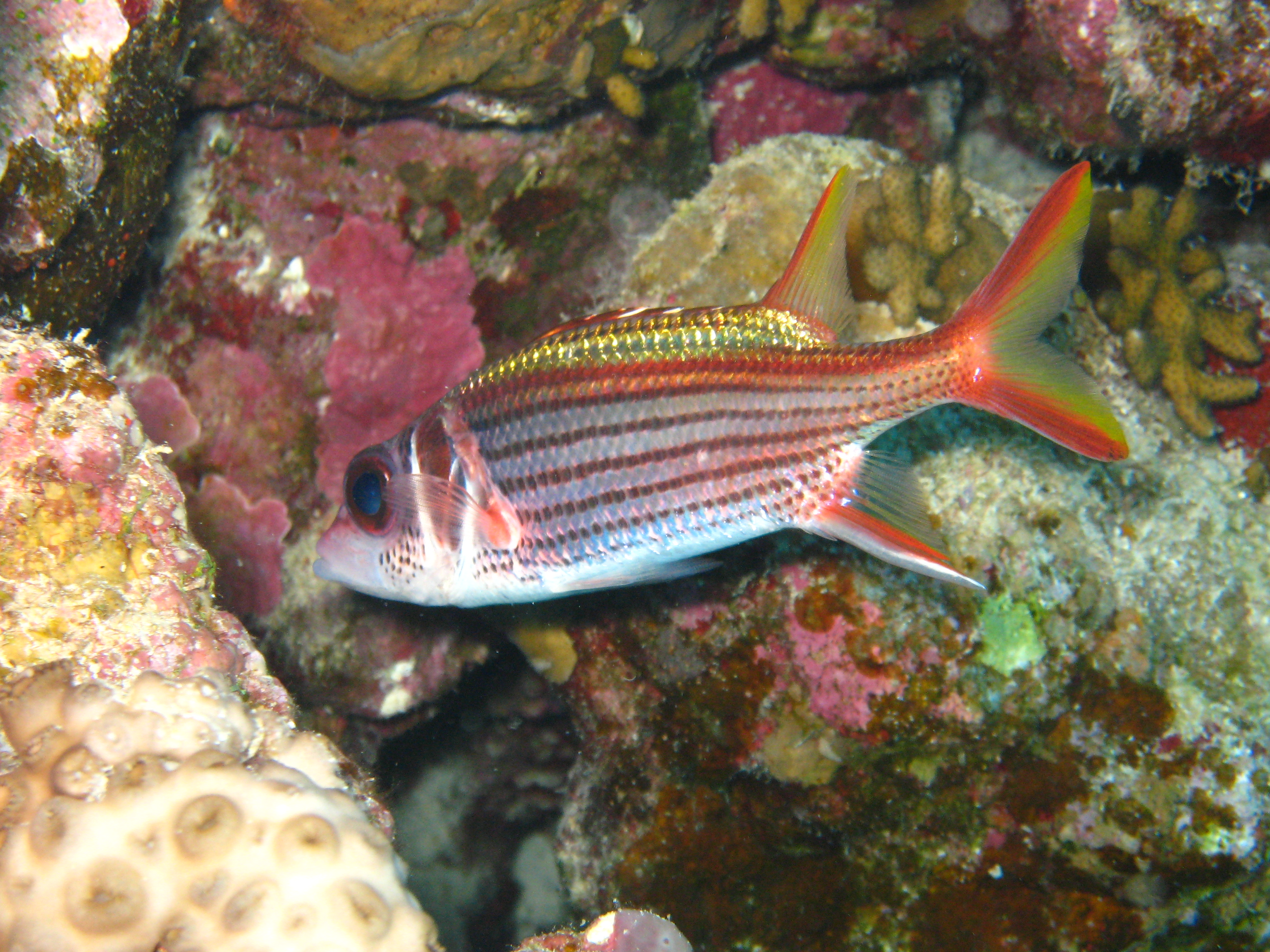

Scientific classification
- Kingdom: Animalia
- Phylum: Chordata
- Class: Actinopterygii
- Order: Beryciformes
- Family: Holocentridae
- Genus: Sargocentron
- Species: S. rubrum

Binomial name
- Sargocentron rubrum (Forsskål, 1775)

= Sargocentron rubrum =

Species of fish

Sargocentron rubrum, also known as redcoat, is a member of the family Holocentridae of the order Beryciformes. Squirrelfish in general are large, active, nocturnal fish which are usually red in color.

It is found in the wide Indo-Pacific, from the Red Sea to the West Pacific, where it ranges from southern Japan to New Caledonia, New South Wales (Australia) and recently Tonga. Observed since the mid-20th century in Levantine waters of the Mediterranean Sea, following entry via the Suez Canal, it is now very common through the entire eastern Basin.
