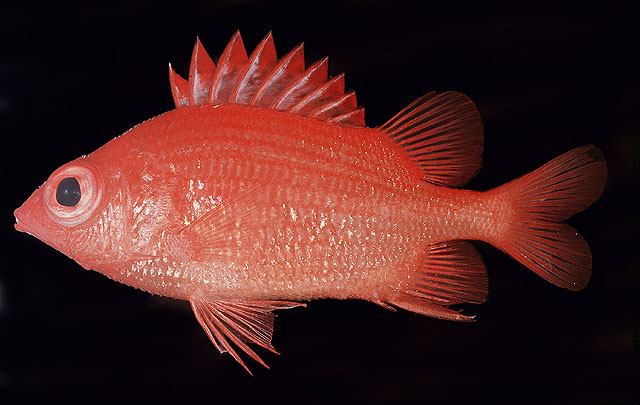

Conservation status
- Least Concern (IUCN 3.1)

Scientific classification
- Domain: Eukaryota
- Kingdom: Animalia
- Phylum: Chordata
- Class: Actinopterygii
- Order: Beryciformes
- Family: Holocentridae
- Genus: Sargocentron
- Species: S. iota

Binomial name
- Sargocentron iota (J.E. Randall, 1998)

= Sargocentron iota =

Dwarf squirrelfish

Species of fish

Sargocentron iota, the dwarf squirrelfish, is a nocturnal benthopelagic species of squirrelfish belonging to the genus of Sargocentron. It can be found in the Indo-Pacific region. It inhabits steep outer reef slopes.
