= Sargocentron bullisi =

- Photo of a deepwater squirrelfish facing left, near a small coral overhang

Conservation status
- Least Concern (IUCN 3.1)

Scientific classification
- Kingdom: Animalia
- Phylum: Chordata
- Class: Actinopterygii
- Division: Teleostei
- Order: Beryciformes
- Family: Holocentridae
- Genus: Sargocentron
- Species: S. bullisi

Binomial name
- Sargocentron bullisi (Woods, 1955)

Synonyms
- Holocentrus bullisi Woods, 1955; Adioryx bullisi (Woods, 1955); Holocentrus bullisss Woods, 1955

Species of fish

Sargocentron bullisi, more commonly known as the deepwater squirrelfish, is a nocturnal, reef-associated predator of the family Holocentridae. It is native to the West Atlantic from North Carolina, USA to southern Brazil and throughout the Caribbean Sea. It lives 33 to 110 metres (108 to 361 ft) below the surface. It can reach sizes of up to 13.0 centimetres (5.1 in) SL.
