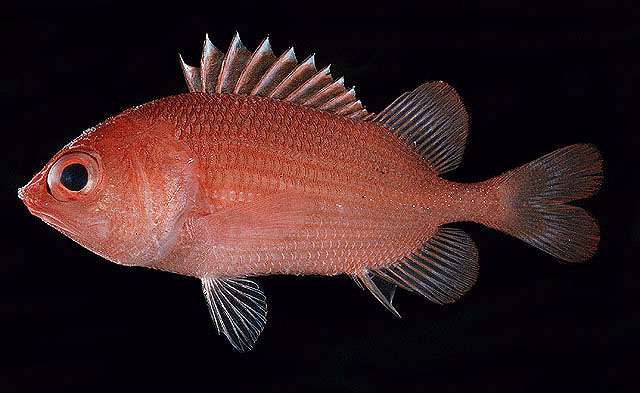

Conservation status
- Least Concern (IUCN 3.1)

Scientific classification
- Kingdom: Animalia
- Phylum: Chordata
- Class: Actinopterygii
- Order: Beryciformes
- Family: Holocentridae
- Genus: Plectrypops
- Species: P. lima

Binomial name
- Plectrypops lima (Valenciennes, 1831)

Synonyms
- Myripistis lima Valenciennes, 1831; Holtrachys lima Valenciennes, 1831

= Plectrypops lima =

Species of fish

Plectrypops lima, also known as the shy soldier, is a species of soldierfish in the family Holocentridae (4). It is widely found throughout the Indo-Pacific region, ranging from East Africa to Hawaii and parts of the eastern Pacific Ocean (1, 2). This species is associated with coral reef ecosystems and is considered uncommon but is found on many reefs (5). It hides in crevices and caves during the day and comes out at night to feed (3). Its diet mainly includes small shrimp, crabs, krill, larvae, and small fishes (5). These traits help it survive in low-light reef environments (5).

== Description ==
Plectrypops lima has a slightly elongated body that is compressed from side to side, which is common among soldierfish species (5). It can grow up to about 10 inches in length but is usually around 6 inches long (5). Its body is bright red, which helps it blend into coral reefs, especially in low lighting (3). One of its most noticeable features is its large eyes, which help it see in low-light conditions (5). The dorsal fin has sharp spines that help protect the fish from predators (5). The species also has rough textured scales, which explains its other common name, the roughscale soldierfish (4). These physical features help it survive in reef habitats (5).

== Distribution and habitat ==
Plectrypops lima is widely found throughout the Indo-Pacific region, including areas such as East Africa, Hawaii, Japan, and parts of the Pacific Ocean (1, 2). It has also been observed in Kwajalein in the Marshall Islands (1). The species is found in tropical waters where coral reef systems are present (5). It prefers sheltered habitats such as caves, ledges, and deep crevices within coral reefs (5). It is commonly found at depths between about 3 and 40 meters (5). During the day it remains hidden to avoid predators (5). At night it becomes more active and moves into open areas to search for food (3).

== Humans use ==
There is little evidence that humans use Plectrypops lima for food or fishing because it is relatively small and usually stays hidden (5). However, divers and underwater photographers sometimes observe this species on coral reefs (3). It can also be useful for education and for studying coral reef ecosystems (2).
