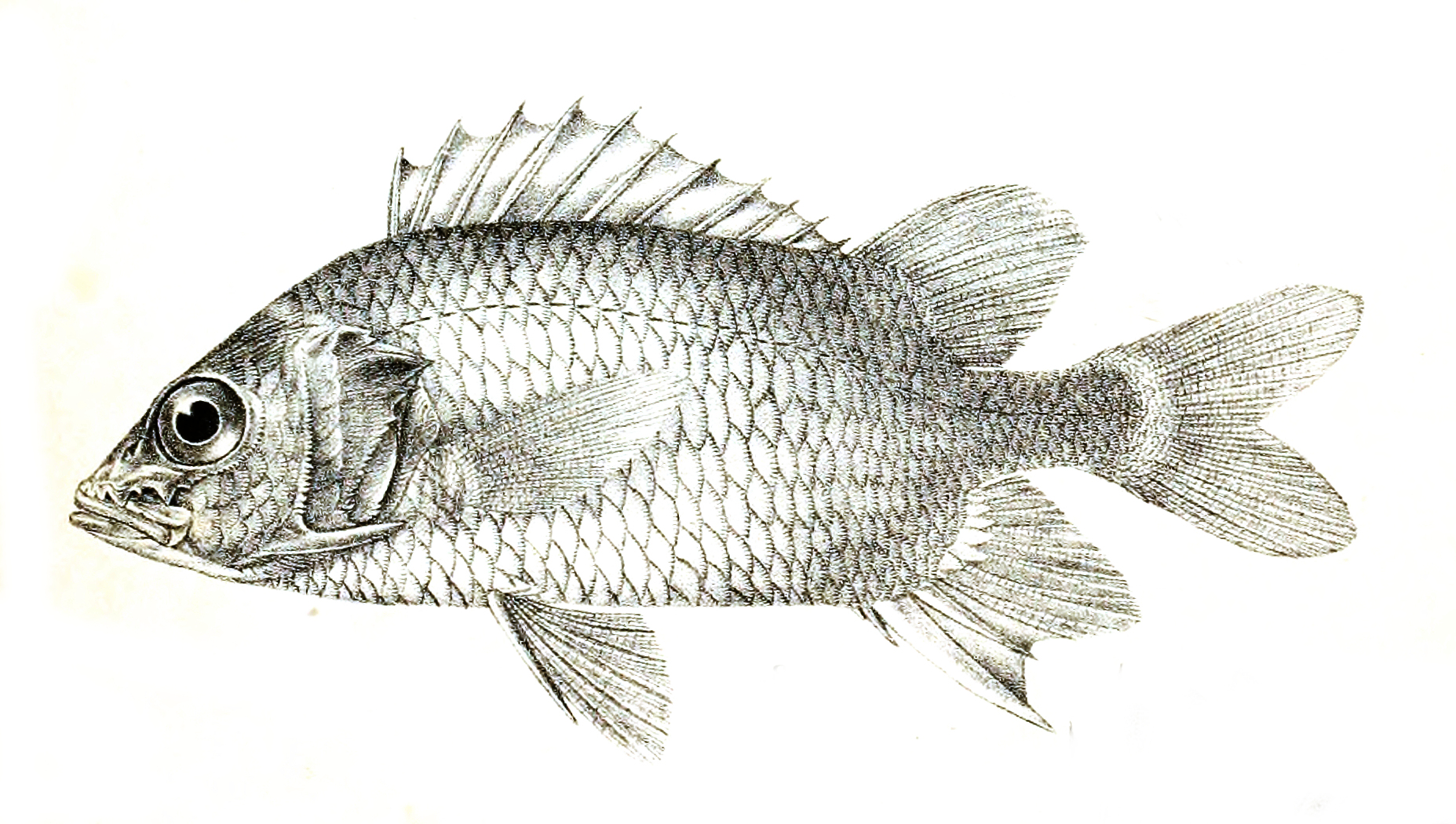

Conservation status
- Least Concern (IUCN 3.1)

Scientific classification
- Kingdom: Animalia
- Phylum: Chordata
- Class: Actinopterygii
- Order: Beryciformes
- Family: Holocentridae
- Genus: Sargocentron
- Species: S. caudimaculatum

Binomial name
- Sargocentron caudimaculatum (Rüppell, 1838)

Synonyms
- Holocentrus caudimaculatus Rüppell, 1838; Adioryx caudimaculatus (Rüppell, 1838); Sargocentron caudimaculatus (Rüppell, 1838); Sargocentron caudomaculatum (Rüppell, 1838); Sargocentron caudomaculatus (Rüppell, 1838); Holocentrum leonoides Bleeker, 1849; Holocentrum andamanense Day, 1871; Adioryx andamanensis (Day, 1871); Holocentrus andamanensis (Day, 1871); Holocentrus rubellio Seale, 1906

= Sargocentron caudimaculatum =

Species of fish

Sargocentron caudimaculatum, the silverspot squirrelfish or whitetail squirrelfish, is a reef-associated member of the family Holocentridae. It is native to the Indian and Pacific Oceans from East Africa to Japan and northern Australia and as far east as the Marshall Islands. It lives near reefs, but can also be found in lagoons and drop-offs at depths between 2 and 40 metres (6.6 and 131.2 ft). It is a nocturnal predator, feeding primarily on crabs and shrimps. It can reach sizes of up to 25.0 centimetres (9.8 in) TL. Although it is caught commercially and can be found in the aquarium trade, there are no known major threats to this species.
