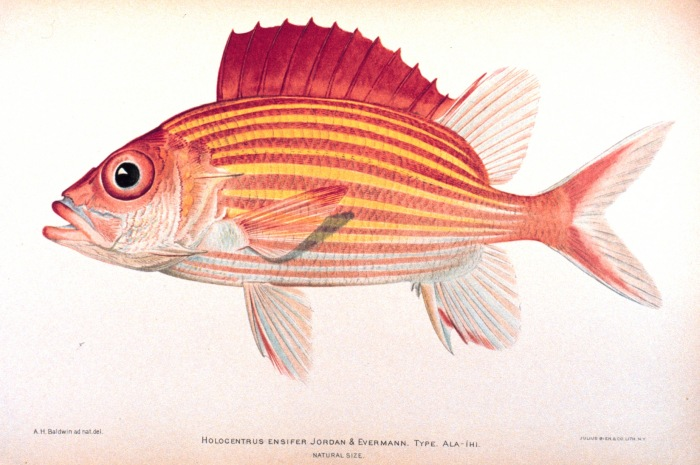
- Sargocentron ensifer caught at the Pitcairn Islands

Conservation status
- Least Concern (IUCN 3.1)

Scientific classification
- Kingdom: Animalia
- Phylum: Chordata
- Class: Actinopterygii
- Order: Beryciformes
- Family: Holocentridae
- Genus: Sargocentron
- Species: S. ensifer

Binomial name
- Sargocentron ensifer (D. S. Jordan & Evermann, 1903)

Synonyms
- Holocentrus ensifer Jordan & Evermann, 1903; Adioryx ensifer (Jordan & Evermann, 1903); Sargocentron ensiferum (Jordan & Evermann, 1903); Adioryx furcatus (non Günther, 1859); Holocentrus furcatus (non Günther, 1859)

= Sargocentron ensifer =

Species of fish

Sargocentron ensifer, also known as the yellow-striped squirrelfish is native to Hawaii, Japan, New Caledonia, Pitcairn, and Paracel Islands in South China Sea. It was originally described as Holocentrus ensifer. Sargocentron ensifer, or the yellow-striped squirrelfish, is a member of the family Holocentridae.

== Description ==
Sargocentron ensifer has a dark reddish colored body with white horizonal stripes. The upper sides and back bear bright yellow stripes which contrast with the red on its body. It can reach up to 23.0 centimeters (9.1 in) SL, though a length of 15.0 centimeters (5.9 in) TL is more common. It feeds at night mainly on crabs, worms, shrimp and small fishes. The species name means “sword bearer,” referring to a long, backward-pointing spine on the gill cover just behind the eye.

== Distribution and habitat ==
Sargocentron ensifer is native to Hawaii, Japan, New Caledonia, Pitcairn, and Paracel Islands in South China Sea. It lives in deep reefs at depths between 0 and 64 metres (0 and 210 ft). It inhabits crevices and caves on seaward reefs habits crevices and caves on seaward reefs and can be found at depths between 3 - 200 feet (1 - 60 m) during daylight hours. It prefers depths greater than 60 feet. It is typically solitary and occurs most commonly off Maui and the Big Island, and its range extends from Okinawa to Hawaii and French Polynesia.
