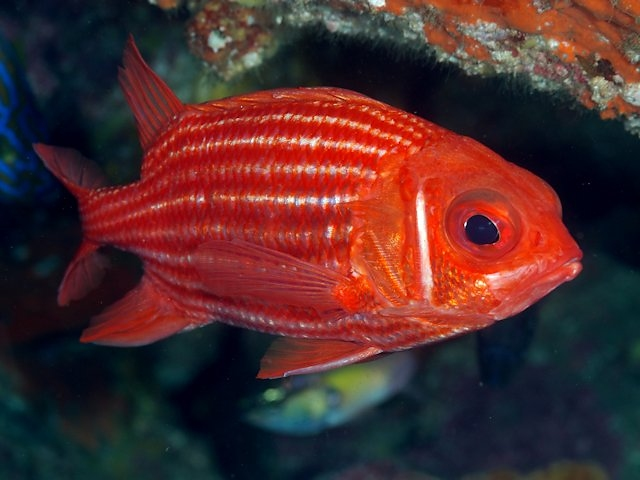

Scientific classification
- Kingdom: Animalia
- Phylum: Chordata
- Class: Actinopterygii
- Division: Teleostei
- Order: Beryciformes
- Family: Holocentridae
- Genus: Sargocentron
- Species: S. spinosissimum

Binomial name
- Sargocentron spinosissimum Temminck & Schlegel, 1843

= Sargocentron spinosissimum =

Species of fish

Sargocentron spinosissimum is a species of fish in the squirrelfishes.
