= Sargocentron hastatum =

Conservation status
- Least Concern (IUCN 3.1)

Scientific classification
- Kingdom: Animalia
- Phylum: Chordata
- Class: Actinopterygii
- Division: Teleostei
- Order: Beryciformes
- Family: Holocentridae
- Genus: Sargocentron
- Species: S. hastatum

Binomial name
- Sargocentron hastatum Cuvier, 1829

Synonyms
- Holocentrum hastatum Cuvier, 1829; Adioryx hastatus (Cuvier, 1829); Holocentrus hastatus (Cuvier, 1829); Sargocentron hastatus (Cuvier, 1829)

Species of fish

Sargocentron hastatum, the red soldierfish or the red squirrelfish is a species of marine fish of the family Holocentridae. It occurs in the eastern Atlantic, from the coasts of Portugal down to Angola, including Cape Verde.

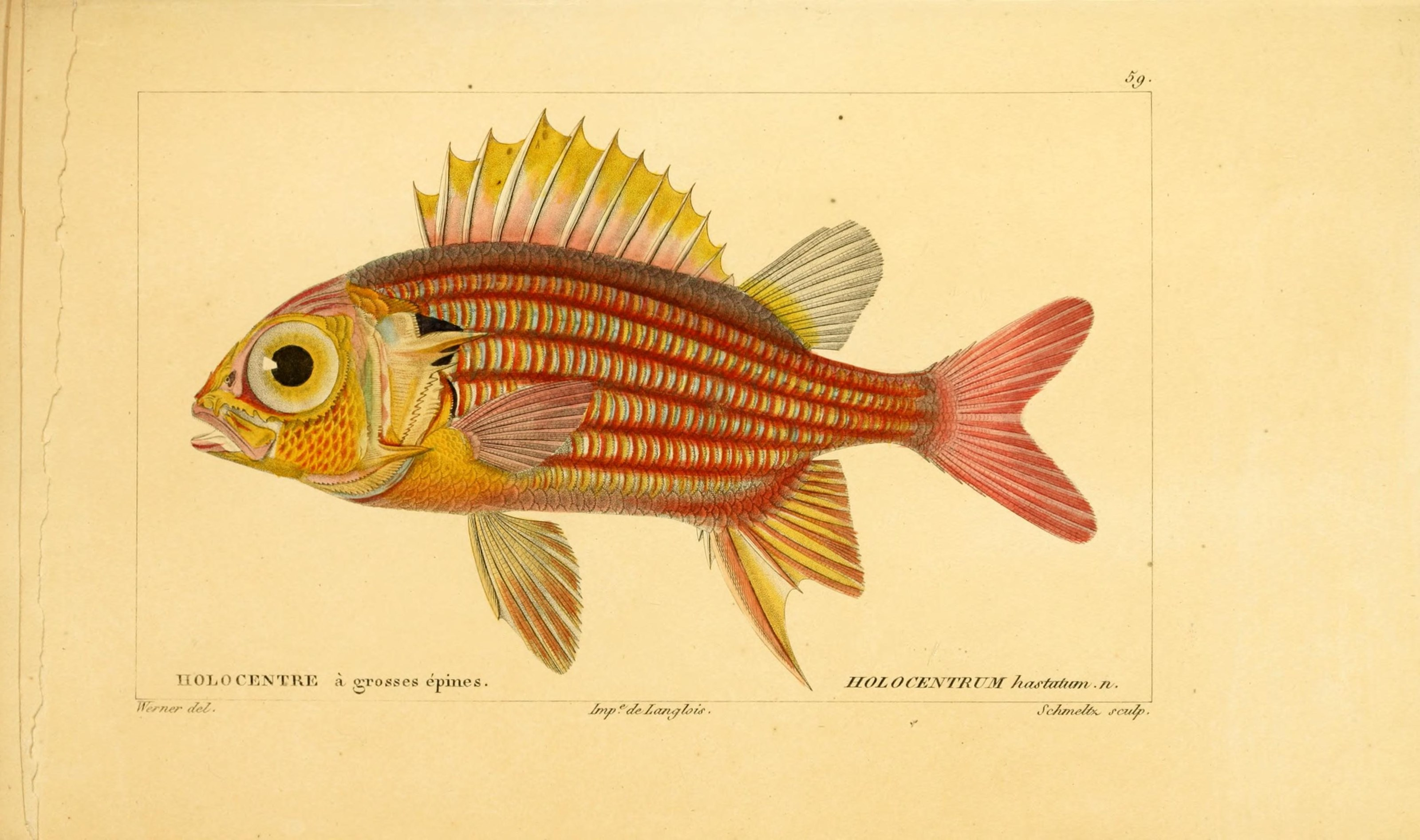
Sargocentron hastatum, in Histoire naturelle des poissons, Cuvier, 1829

This fish grows to a maximal length of 28 centimetres (11 in).

== Habitat ==
It occurs in rocky areas and reefs from the shoreline down to a depth of 200 metres (660 ft).

== Uses ==
This fish is locally caught and marketed fresh or smoked, but not in abundance.
