= Sargocentron borodinoensis =

Borodino soldierfish

Scientific classification
- Domain: Eukaryota
- Kingdom: Animalia
- Phylum: Chordata
- Class: Actinopterygii
- Order: Beryciformes
- Family: Holocentridae
- Genus: Sargocentron
- Species: S. borodinoensis

Binomial name
- Sargocentron borodinoensis Kotlyar, 2017

Species of fish

Sargocentron borodinoensis, the Borodino soldierfish, is a member of the genus Sargocentron found in the Western Pacific Ocean in the Philippine Sea. It was discovered by the Borodino Submarine Elevation along one of the mountains, and is named in honor of it.
