= Adriacentrus =

Adriacentrus Temporal range: Turonian

Scientific classification
- Domain: Eukaryota
- Kingdom: Animalia
- Phylum: Chordata
- Class: Actinopterygii
- Order: Beryciformes
- Suborder: Holocentroidei
- Genus: †Adriacentrus; Radovcic, 1975
- Species: †A. crnolataci

Binomial name
- †Adriacentrus crnolataci Radovcic, 1975

Extinct genus of fishes

Adriacentrus is an extinct genus of prehistoric marine bony fish that lived in the Turonian in what is now Croatia. It contains a single species, A. crnolataci. Formerly considered a beryciform fish, it is now known to be more closely related to the squirrelfish (Holocentridae).
