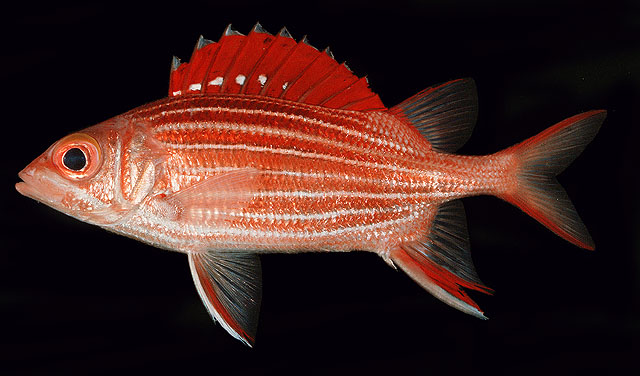

Conservation status
- Least Concern (IUCN 3.1)

Scientific classification
- Kingdom: Animalia
- Phylum: Chordata
- Class: Actinopterygii
- Order: Beryciformes
- Family: Holocentridae
- Genus: Sargocentron
- Species: S. hormion

Binomial name
- Sargocentron hormion (J.E. Randall, 1998)

= Sargocentron hormion =

Species of fish

Sargocentron hormion is a species of Squirrelfish belonging to the genus Sargocentron. It is reported to have been found in Pitcairn, the Cook Islands and French Polynesia. It inhabits rocky bottoms and coral reefs.
