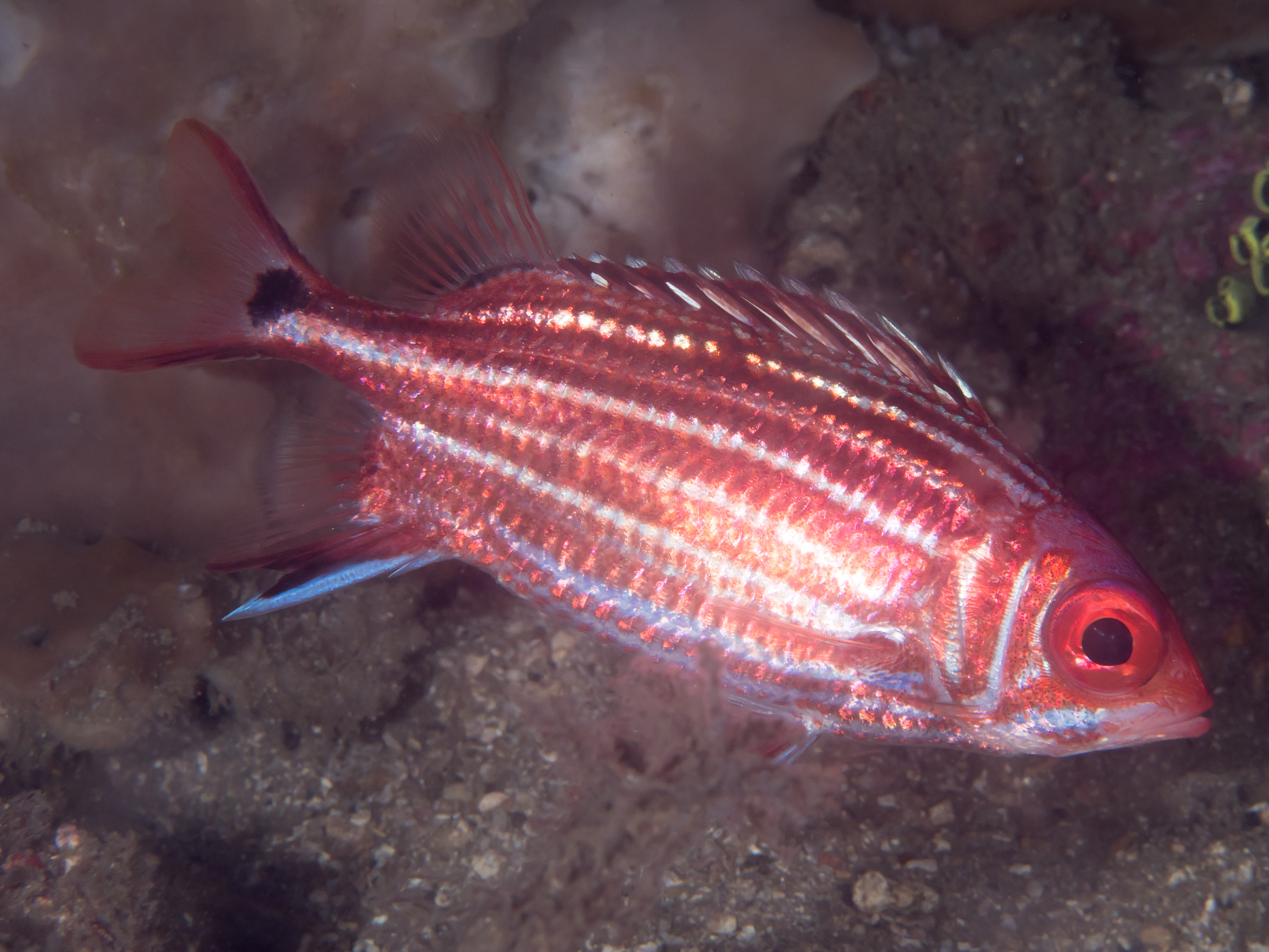

Conservation status
- Least Concern (IUCN 3.1)

Scientific classification
- Kingdom: Animalia
- Phylum: Chordata
- Class: Actinopterygii
- Order: Beryciformes
- Family: Holocentridae
- Genus: Sargocentron
- Species: S. cornutum

Binomial name
- Sargocentron cornutum (Bleeker, 1854)

Synonyms
- Holocentrum cornutum Bleeker, 1854; Holocentrus cornutus Bleeker, 1854; Holocentrus cornutum Bleeker, 1854; Sargocentrum cornutum (Bleeker, 1854)

= Sargocentron cornutum =

Species of fish

Sargocentron cornutum, the threespot squirrelfish, is a member of the family Holocentridae native to the western Pacific Ocean from Indonesia to the Great Barrier Reef. It lives in coral reefs and drop-offs between depths of 6–40 m (20–131 ft). It is a nocturnal predator, feeding on crabs and shrimps by night and hiding under ledges or in caves by day. It can reach sizes of up to 27.0 cm (10.6 in) TL and has a venomous preopercle.
