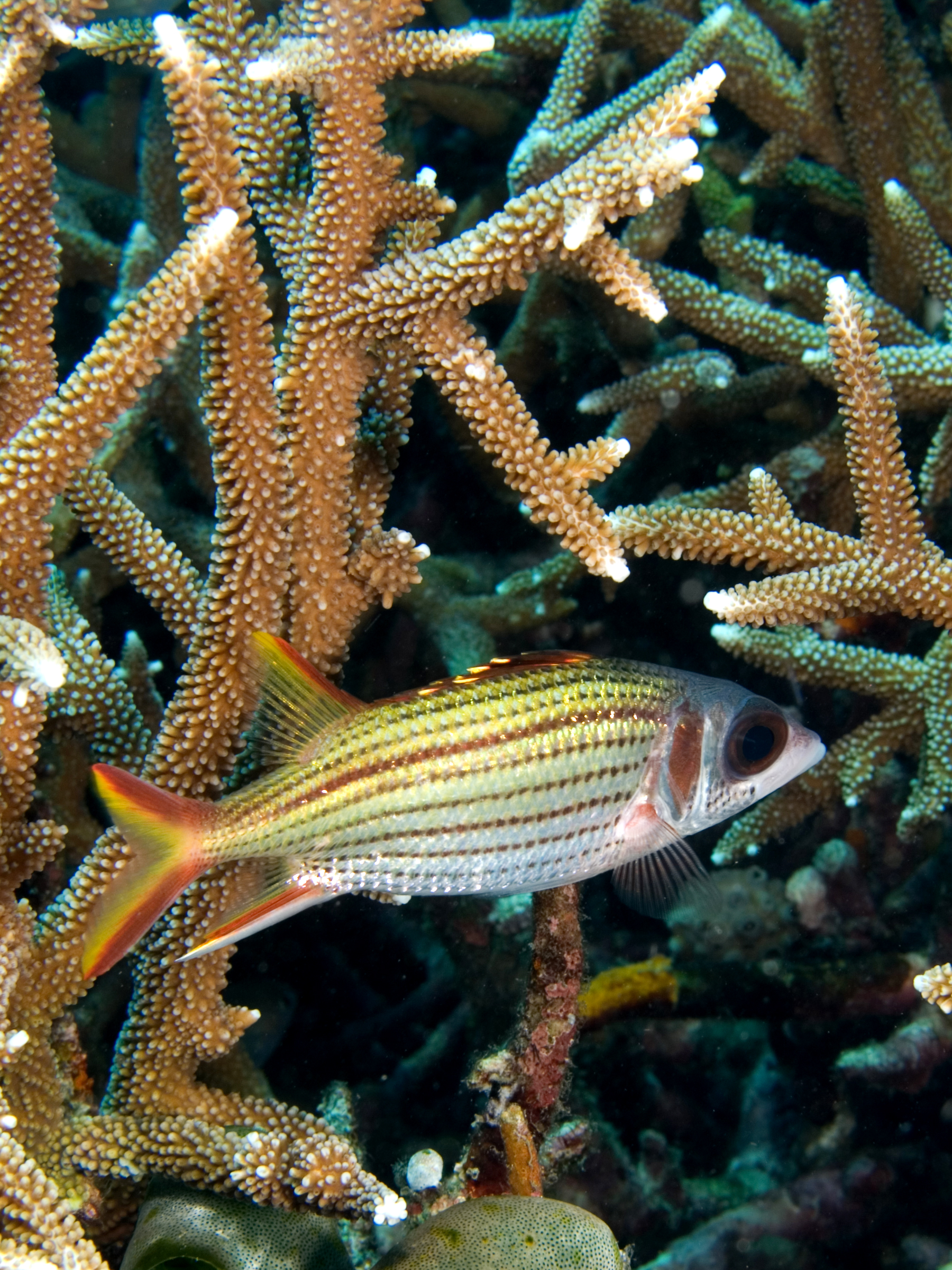

Conservation status
- Least Concern (IUCN 3.1)

Scientific classification
- Kingdom: Animalia
- Phylum: Chordata
- Class: Actinopterygii
- Order: Beryciformes
- Family: Holocentridae
- Genus: Sargocentron
- Species: S. microstoma

Binomial name
- Sargocentron microstoma (Günther, 1859)

Synonyms
- Holocentrum microstoma Günther, 1859; Adioryx microstomus (Günther, 1859); Holocentrus microstoma Günther, 1859; Holocentrus microstomus Günther, 1859; Sargocentron microstomum (Günther, 1859); Sargocentron microstomus (Günther, 1859); Sargocentron mitrostomus (Günther, 1859); Holocentrum argenteum (non Valenciennes, 1831)

= Sargocentron microstoma =

Species of fish

Sargocentron microstoma, the fine-lined squirrelfish, slender squirrelfish or smallmouth squirrelfish, is a member of the family Holocentridae. It has a wide range throughout the Indo-Pacific from the Chagos Archipelago, Seychelles, and the Maldives to the Hawaiian Islands, Line Islands, and the Tuamotus Archipelago, north to the Ryukyu Islands and Bonin Islands, south to Austral Islands and throughout Micronesia. It lives near reefs usually at depths between 1–35 m (3.3–114.8 ft), but can be found as deep as 183 m (600 ft). During the day it hides in crevices, especially near Acropora and Pocillopora. It is a nocturnal predator, feeding on crustaceans, worms, and fishes. It can reach sizes of up to 20 cm (7.9 in) TL and has a venomous preopercle.
