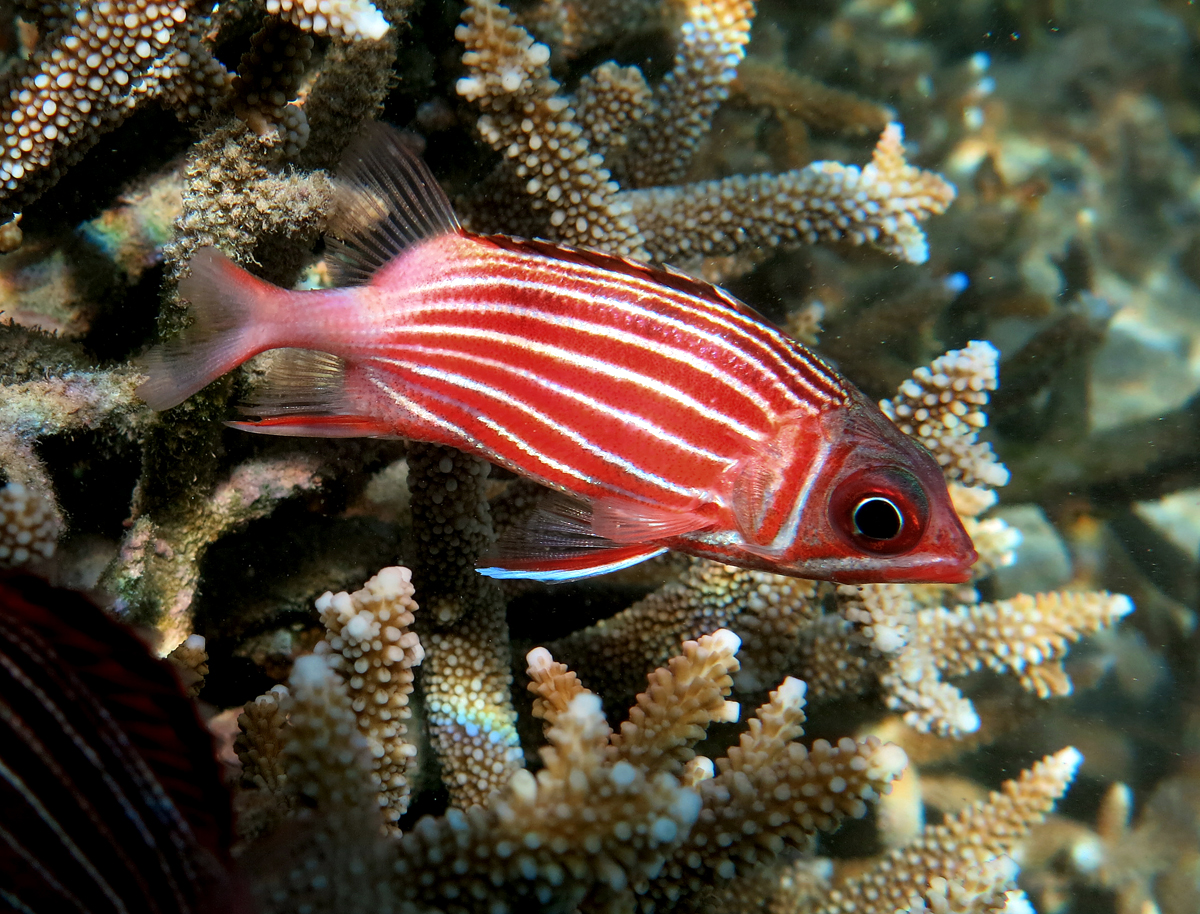

Scientific classification
- Kingdom: Animalia
- Phylum: Chordata
- Class: Actinopterygii
- Division: Teleostei
- Order: Beryciformes
- Family: Holocentridae
- Genus: Sargocentron
- Species: S. diadema

Binomial name
- Sargocentron diadema (Lacépède, 1802)

= Sargocentron diadema =

Species of fish

Sargocentron diadema, known commonly as the crowned squirrelfish, is a species of marine ray-finned fish belonging to the family Holocentridae, which is the only family in the order Holocentriformes. Squirrelfish in general are large, active, nocturnal fish which are usually red in color.

== Distribution ==
The crowned squirrelfish is commonly found on the reefs of the Indo-Pacific, from East Africa to Tahiti.

== Description ==
The fish is bright red with thin white lines crossing from the gill cover to the caudal peduncle. The gill cover has two vertical white lines. A third line runs along the upper lip and below the large eye.

== In captivity ==
This species is sometimes kept in aquaria. It is an active, shoaling fish which is kept in large tanks with other individuals of the species. Other species of a similar size can be kept with it, but it may eat smaller fish. It can be sustained on meat-based fish food.

The aquarium is kept between 72 and 78 °F (22 and 26 °C) the pH is about 8.1 to 8.4, and the salinity is 1.020 to 1.025.
