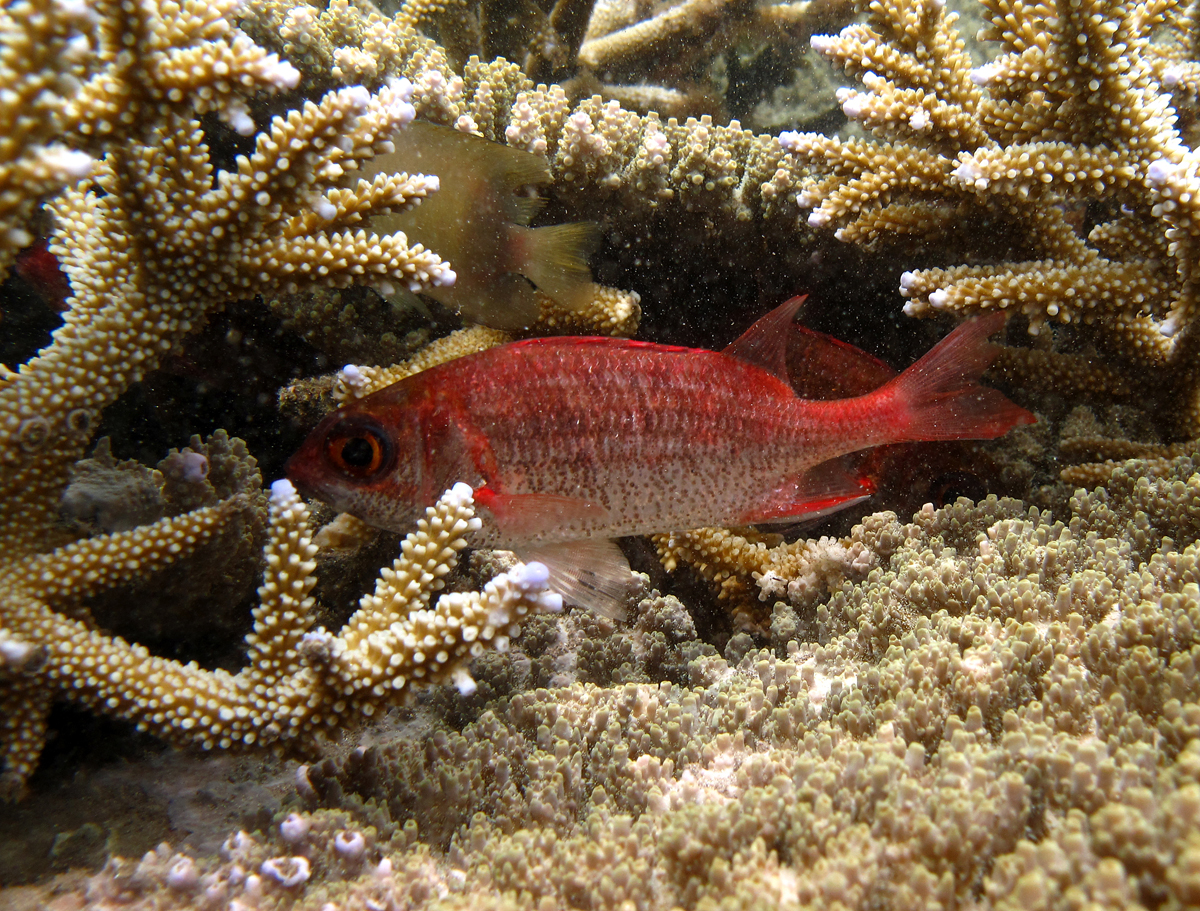

Scientific classification
- Kingdom: Animalia
- Phylum: Chordata
- Class: Actinopterygii
- Division: Teleostei
- Order: Beryciformes
- Family: Holocentridae
- Genus: Sargocentron
- Species: S. punctatissimum

Binomial name
- Sargocentron punctatissimum (G. Cuvier, 1829)

= Sargocentron punctatissimum =

Species of ray-finned fish

Sargocentron punctatissimum is a species of fish related to the squirrelfish. It can be found in the Indo-Pacific, including the Red Sea, South Africa and the Hawaiian and Easter Islands. It is commonly referred to as the peppered squirrelfish. It was first discovered and recorded by Georges Cuvier in 1829 as Holocentrum punctatissimum. Cuvier first documented the specimen from Strong Island of the Caroline Islands during his La Coquille expedition from 1822 - 1825.

== Anatomy and morphology ==
Sargocentron punctatissimum is described by Georges Cuvier in 1829 as having a reddish-pinkish body covered in dark and silvery specks. A brown spot behind the membrane of its fins could be seen. These distinct spots are often referred to as a peppered pattern which is where the name peppered squirrelfish is derived. It is a relatively small ray-finned fish, generally reaching a range between 13 and 20 cm (5.1 and 7.9 in). The fish features larger bulging eyes which are adapted for deeper low-light level vision underwater. The rhodopsin visual pigments found in S. punctatissimum had a maximal absorption wavelength (max) value of approximately 494 nm. The following spine order of S. punctatissimum was recorded as: D. 11/13; A. 4/9; C.19; P.15; V.1/7. Structurally, The fish features 11 anterior unsegmented spines on its dorsal fin, and 13 soft rays on its posterior. Additionally, front of the anal fin (bottom rear fin) consists of 4 hardened spines, Cuvier emphasizes the third anal spine as distinctly long, stout and strong. This was then followed by 9 soft rays. The tail fin has a total of 19 rays forming its shape. Each side pectoral fin was made up of 15 soft rays. Lastly, Each Ventral/Pelvic Fin contains 1 leading hard spine and 7 soft rays. The Preopercular Spine of S. punctatissimum is known to be venomous.

== Distribution and habitat ==
Sargocentron punctatissimum can be found in the Indo-Pacific, including the Red Sea, South Africa and the Hawaiian and Easter Islands. The species is classified as inhabiting a shallow-water marine environment (Type I). This means S. punctatissimum lives at depths down to 10 m (33 ft). Shallow Coral Reef Flats, Tidepools, and rocky shorelines, and high energy surge zones. The Unique evolutionary adaptation of its eye pigments suggest a specific tuning to the blue-green light wavelengths that penetrate the shallow water environment.

S. punctatissimum is known to be a nocturnal hunter having adjusted their eyesight through evolutionary adaption. This unique adaption allows the fish to hunt over sand flats and open reefs in order to feed on small crustaceans and their larvae. Additional food tends to be smaller like polychaete worms, Shrimp/Prawns, Crabs, and Gastropods.
