= Erugocentrus =

Erugocentrus Temporal range: Turonian

Scientific classification
- Domain: Eukaryota
- Kingdom: Animalia
- Phylum: Chordata
- Class: Actinopterygii
- Order: Beryciformes
- Suborder: Holocentroidei
- Genus: †Erugocentrus; Radovcic, 1975
- Species: †E. illyricus

Binomial name
- †Erugocentrus illyricus Radovcic, 1975

Extinct genus of fishes

Erugocentrus is an extinct genus of prehistoric marine ray-finned fish that lived during Late Cretaceous. It contains a single species, E. illyricus, known from Turonian-aged sediments of Hvar Island, Croatia. It may be a potential relative of Holocentroidei.
