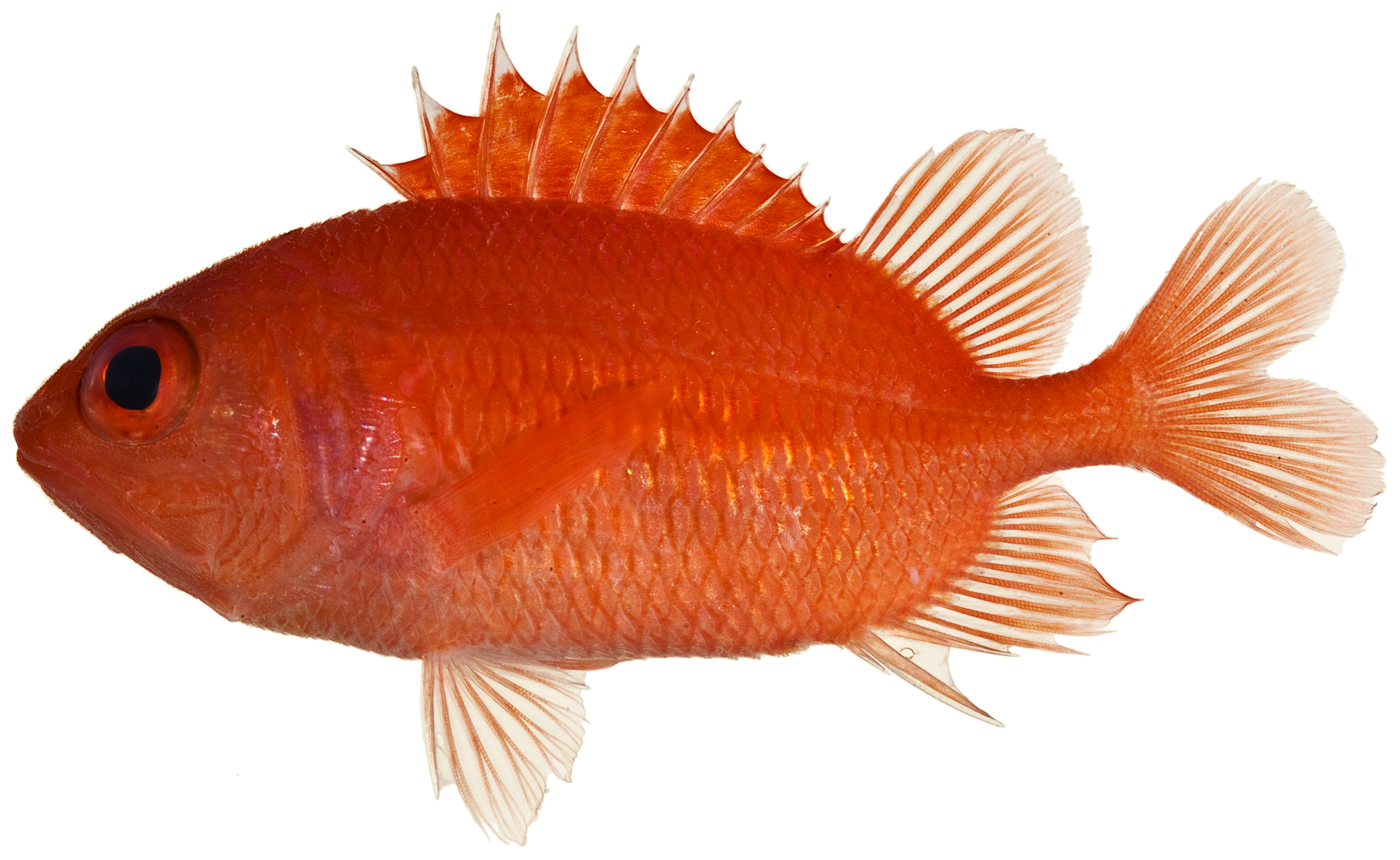

Conservation status
- Least Concern (IUCN 3.1)

Scientific classification
- Kingdom: Animalia
- Phylum: Chordata
- Class: Actinopterygii
- Order: Beryciformes
- Family: Holocentridae
- Genus: Plectrypops
- Species: P. retrospinis

Binomial name
- Plectrypops retrospinis (Guichenot, 1853)

Synonyms
- Holocentrum retrospinis Guichenot, 1853

= Plectrypops retrospinis =

Species of fish

Plectrypops retrospinis, the cardinal soldierfish, is a species of soldierfish from the genus Plectrypops. It can be found in the Western Atlantic Ocean, in Bermuda, southern Florida, and from the Bahamas to Brazil. It can be found in holes and caves in coral reefs. During the day, it remains in deep recesses.
