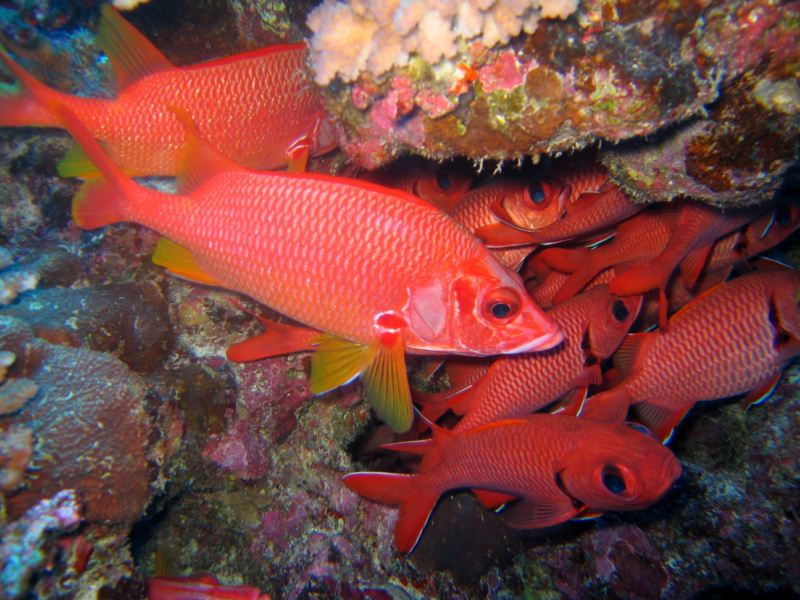
- Sargocentron spiniferum

Scientific classification
- Kingdom: Animalia
- Phylum: Chordata
- Class: Actinopterygii
- Division: Teleostei
- Order: Beryciformes
- Family: Holocentridae
- Subfamily: Holocentrinae
- Genus: Sargocentron; Fowler, 1904

Type species
- Holocentrum leo Cuvier, 1829

Synonyms
- Adioryx Starks, 1908; Cephalofarer (subgenus of Holocentrus) Whitley, 1933; Dispinus Li in Li, Wang & Wu, 1981; Faremusca (subgenus of Holocentrus) Whitley, 1933

= Sargocentron =

Sargocentron Temporal range: 55–0 Ma Early Eocene to Present

Genus of fishes

Sargocentron is a genus of squirrelfish (family Holocentridae) found in tropical parts of the Indian, Pacific and Atlantic Oceans, with the greatest species diversity near reefs in the Indo-Pacific.

Being largely or entirely nocturnal, they have relatively large eyes. Red and silvery colours dominate. The preopercle spines (near the gill-opening) are venomous and can give painful wounds. Most have a maximum length of 15–25 cm (6–10 in), but S. iota barely reaches 8 cm (3 in), and S. spiniferum can reach more than 50 cm (20 in).

== Species ==
There are currently 31 recognized species in this genus:

- Sargocentron borodinoensis Kotlyar, 2017
- Sargocentron bullisi (Woods, 1955) (Deep-water squirrelfish)
- Sargocentron caudimaculatum (Rüppell, 1838) (Silver-spot squirrelfish)
- Sargocentron cornutum (Bleeker, 1854) (Three-spot squirrelfish)
- Sargocentron diadema (Lacépède, 1802) (Crown squirrelfish)
- Sargocentron dorsomaculatum (Shimizu & Yamakawa, 1979) (Spot-fin squirrelfish)
- Sargocentron ensifer (D. S. Jordan & Evermann, 1903) (Yellow-striped squirrelfish)
- Sargocentron hastatum (G. Cuvier, 1829) (Red squirrelfish)
- Sargocentron hormion J. E. Randall, 1998
- Sargocentron inaequalis J. E. Randall & Heemstra, 1985 (Lattice squirrelfish)
- Sargocentron iota J. E. Randall, 1998 (Dwarf squirrelfish)
- Sargocentron ittodai (D. S. Jordan & Fowler, 1902) (Samurai squirrelfish)
- Sargocentron lepros (G. R. Allen & N. J. Cross, 1983) (Spiny squirrelfish)
- Sargocentron macrosquamis Golani, 1984 (Big-scale squirrelfish)
- Sargocentron marisrubri J. E. Randall, Golani & Diamant, 1989
- Sargocentron megalops J. E. Randall, 1998
- Sargocentron melanospilos (Bleeker, 1858) (Black-blotch squirrelfish)
- Sargocentron microstoma (Günther, 1859) (Small-mouth squirrelfish)
- Sargocentron poco (Woods, 1965) (Saddle squirrelfish)
- Sargocentron praslin (Lacépède, 1802) (Dark-striped squirrelfish)
- Sargocentron punctatissimum (G. Cuvier, 1829) (Speckled squirrelfish)
- Sargocentron rubrum (Forsskål, 1775) (Red-coat squirrelfish)
- Sargocentron seychellense (J. L. B. Smith & M. M. Smith, 1963) (Yellow-tipped squirrelfish)
- Sargocentron shimizui J. E. Randall, 1998 (Shimizu's squirrelfish)
- Sargocentron spiniferum (Forsskål, 1775) (Sabre squirrelfish)
- Sargocentron spinosissimum (Temminck & Schlegel, 1843) (North Pacific squirrelfish)
- Sargocentron tiere (G. Cuvier, 1829) (Blue-lined squirrelfish)
- Sargocentron tiereoides (Bleeker, 1853) (Pink squirrelfish)
- Sargocentron violaceum (Bleeker, 1853) (Violet squirrelfish)
- Sargocentron wilhelmi (F. de Buen, 1963) (Wilhelm's squirrelfish)
- Sargocentron xantherythrum (D. S. Jordan & Evermann, 1903) (Hawaiian squirrelfish)
