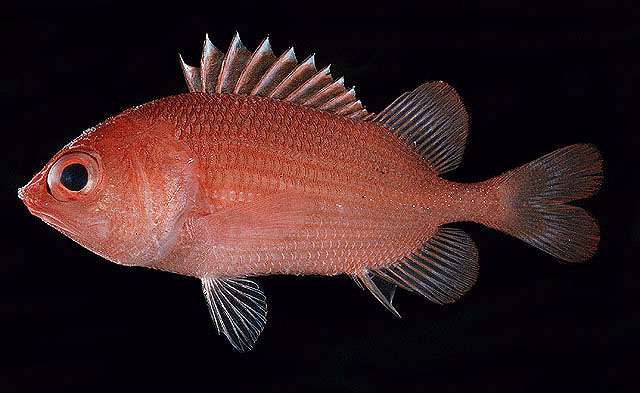
- Plectrypops lima
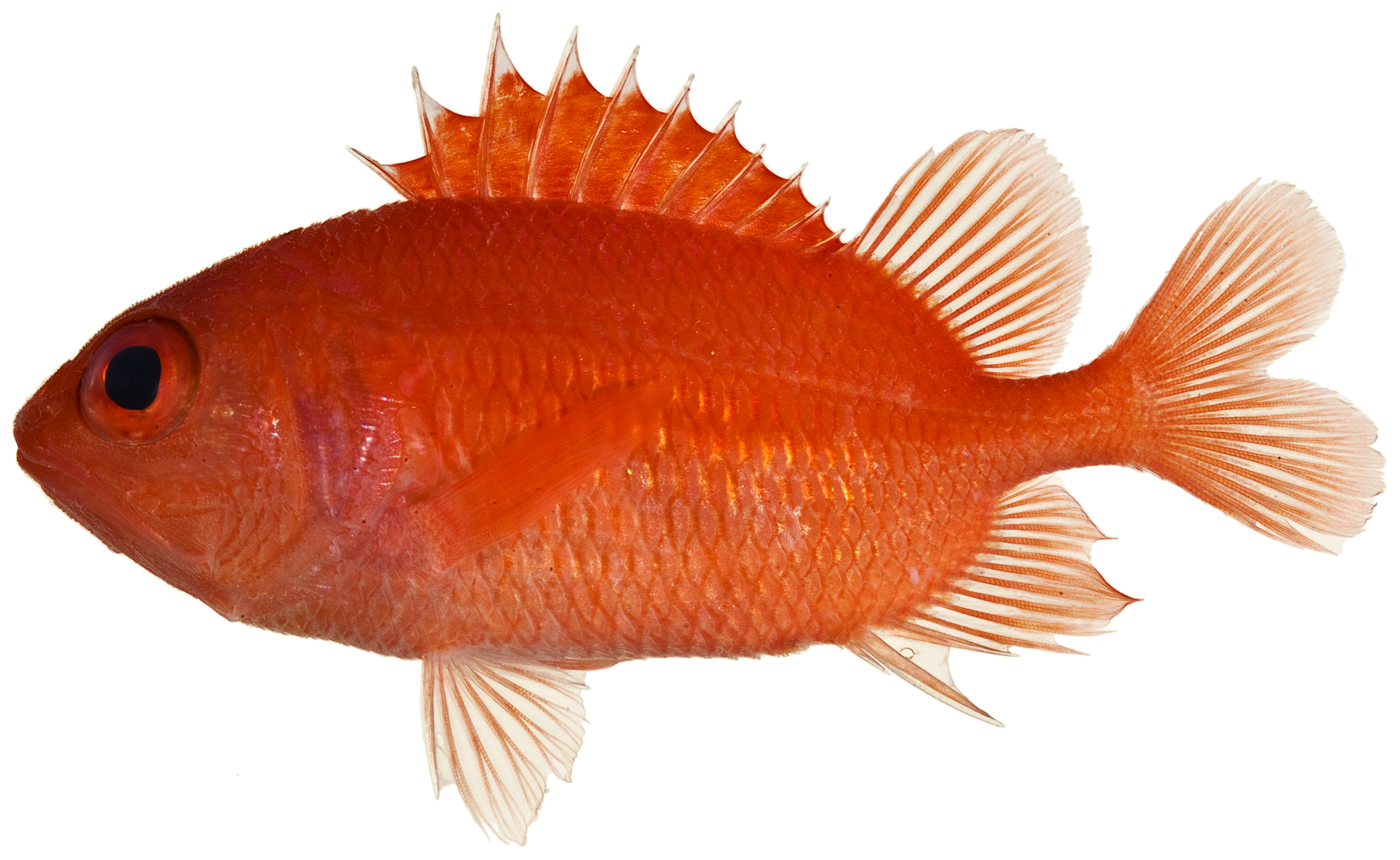
- Plectrypops retrospinis

Scientific classification
- Kingdom: Animalia
- Phylum: Chordata
- Class: Actinopterygii
- Division: Teleostei
- Order: Beryciformes
- Family: Holocentridae
- Genus: Plectrypops; T. N. Gill, 1862

= Plectrypops =

Extinct genus of fishes

Plectrypops is a genus of soldierfish containing two extant species, with one species in the Indo-Pacific, and another in the western Atlantic and the Caribbean. They are red and reach a length of approximately 15 cm (6 in). Some members of this genus are also known from fossil remains.

== Species ==
There are currently two recognized species in this genus:

- Plectrypops lima (Valenciennes, 1831) (Shy soldier)
- Plectrypops retrospinis (Guichenot, 1853) (Cardinal soldierfish)

== See also ==
- Prehistoric fish
- List of prehistoric bony fish
