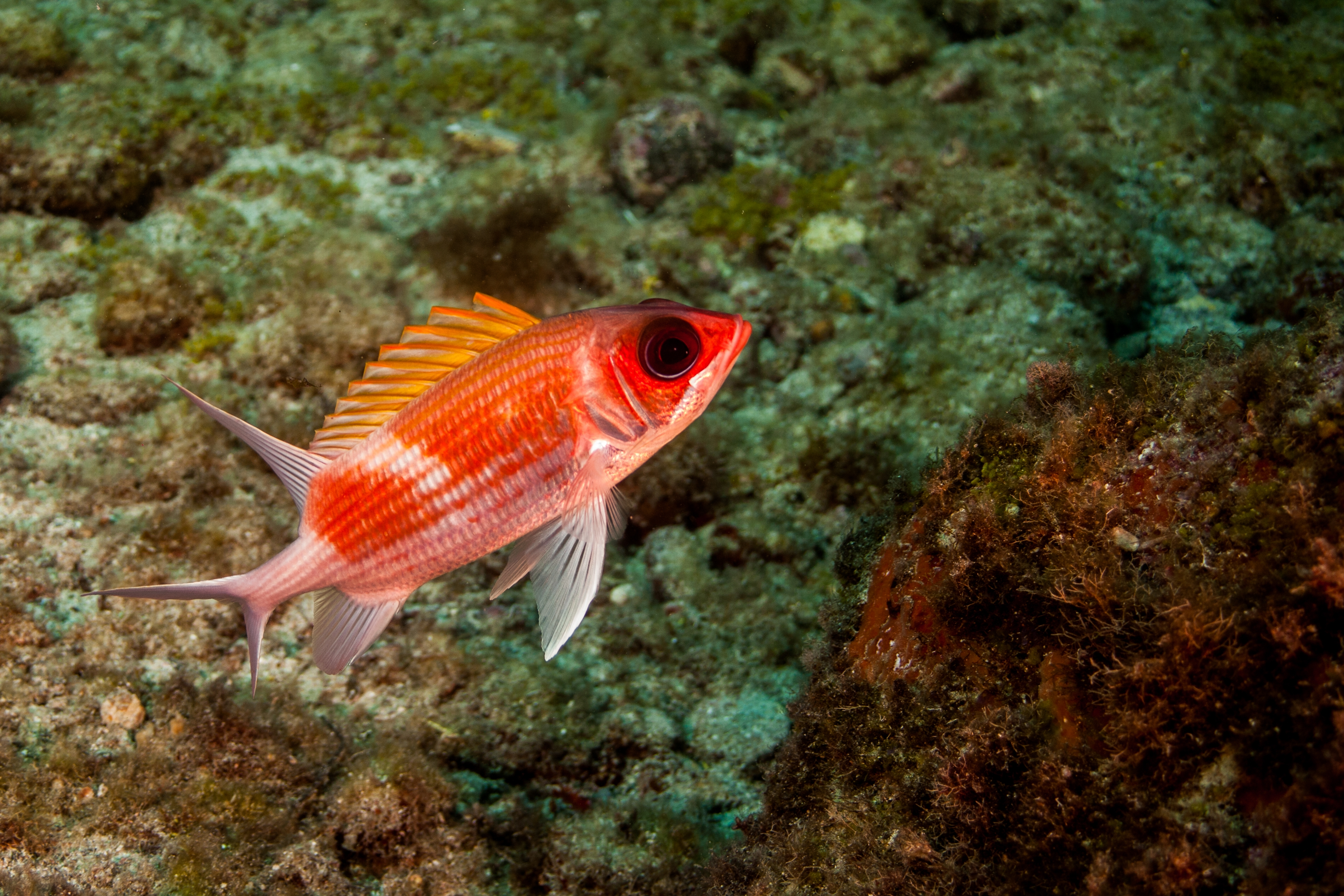

Conservation status
- Least Concern (IUCN 3.1)

Scientific classification
- Kingdom: Animalia
- Phylum: Chordata
- Class: Actinopterygii
- Division: Teleostei
- Order: Beryciformes
- Family: Holocentridae
- Genus: Holocentrus
- Species: H. adscensionis

Binomial name
- Holocentrus adscensionis (Osbeck, 1765)

= Holocentrus adscensionis =

Species of fish

Holocentrus adscensionis is a squirrelfish of the family Holocentridae found in the Atlantic Ocean. Its range extends from North Carolina, USA to Brazil and throughout the Caribbean Sea in the Western Atlantic and from Gabon to Ascension Island in the Eastern Atlantic. A sighting was reported in 2016 from the central Mediterranean Sea off Malta and in 2023 from the Mediterranean Sea near Northern Cyprus.

It generally stays between 8 and 30 metres (26 and 98 ft) below the surface, but can be found at the surface or as deep as 180 metres (590 ft). It can reach up to 61 centimetres (24 in) TL in length, although it is more common for individuals to be around 25.0 centimetres (9.8 in) TL.
