= Holocentrus =

- Squirrelfish (H. adscensionis)
- Longspine squirrelfish (H. rufus)

Scientific classification
- Kingdom: Animalia
- Phylum: Chordata
- Class: Actinopterygii
- Division: Teleostei
- Order: Beryciformes
- Family: Holocentridae
- Subfamily: Holocentrinae
- Genus: Holocentrus; Scopoli, 1777

Genus of fishes

Holocentrus is a genus of squirrelfishes found in the Atlantic Ocean.

== Species ==
There are currently two recognized species in this genus:

Image	Species	Common name
	Holocentrus adscensionis (Osbeck, 1765)	Squirrelfish
	Holocentrus rufus (Walbaum, 1792)	Longspine squirrelfish

== Gallery ==
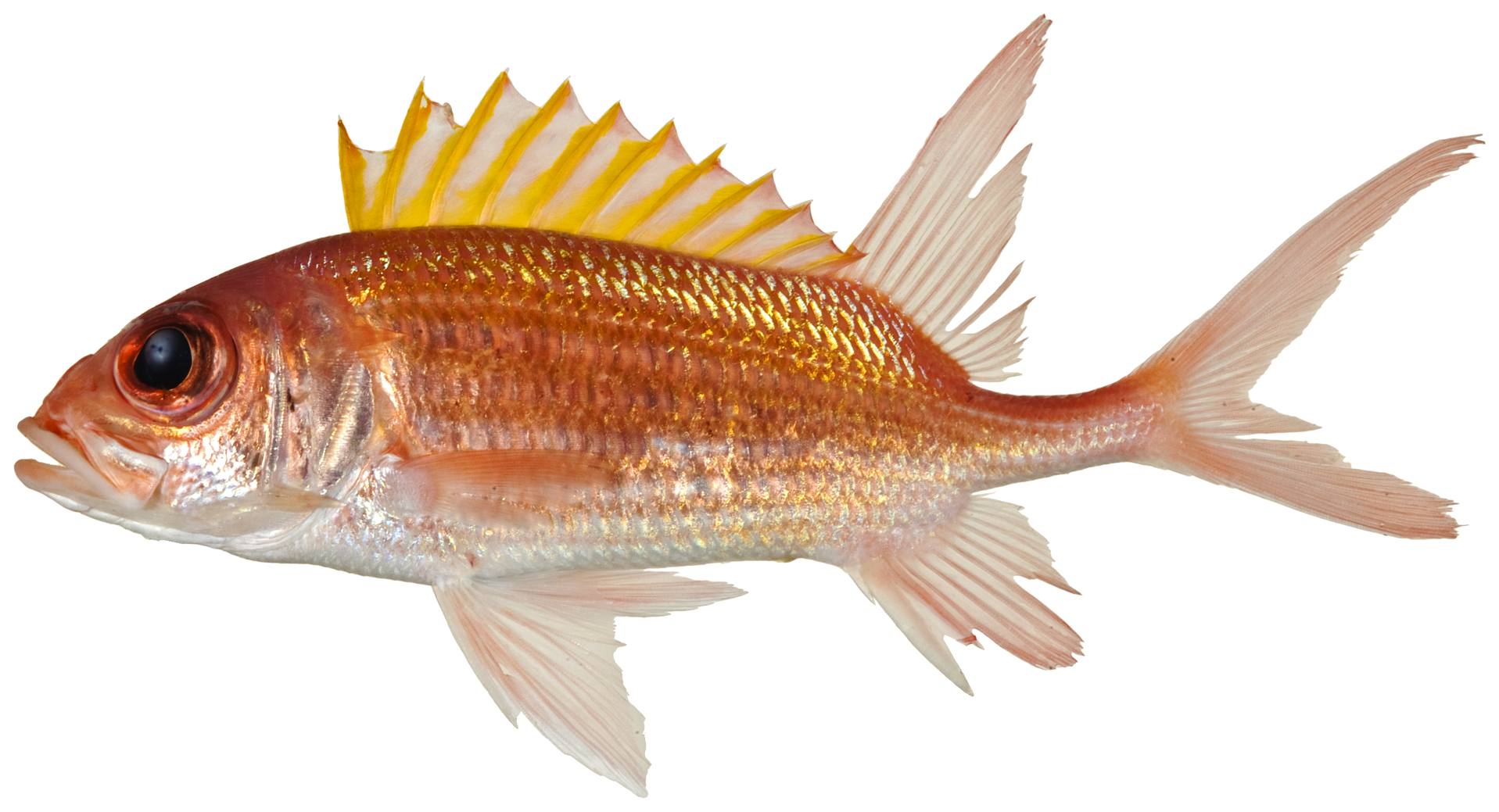
H. adscensionis (19.5 cm SL)

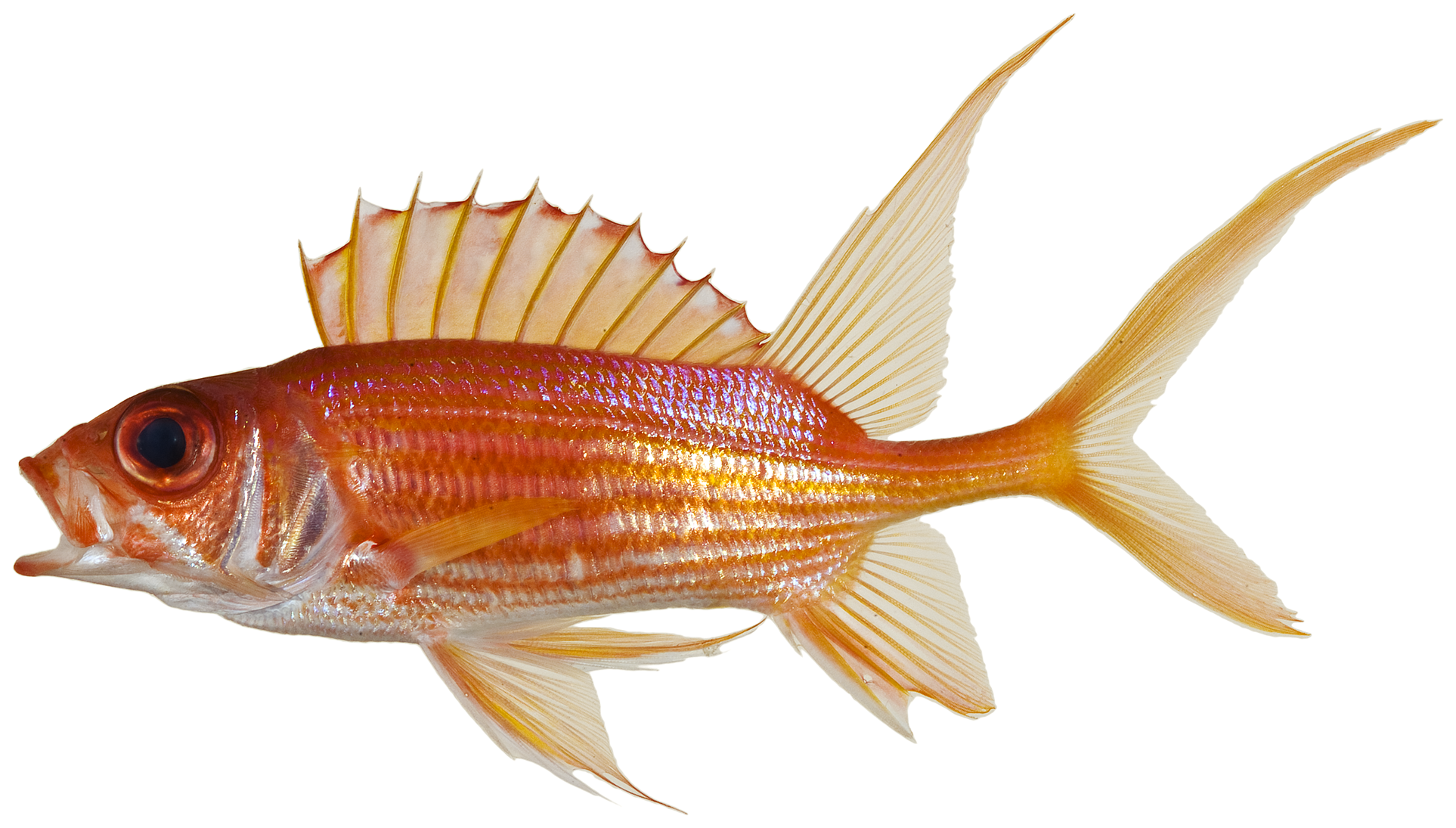
H. rufus (15.3 cm SL)
