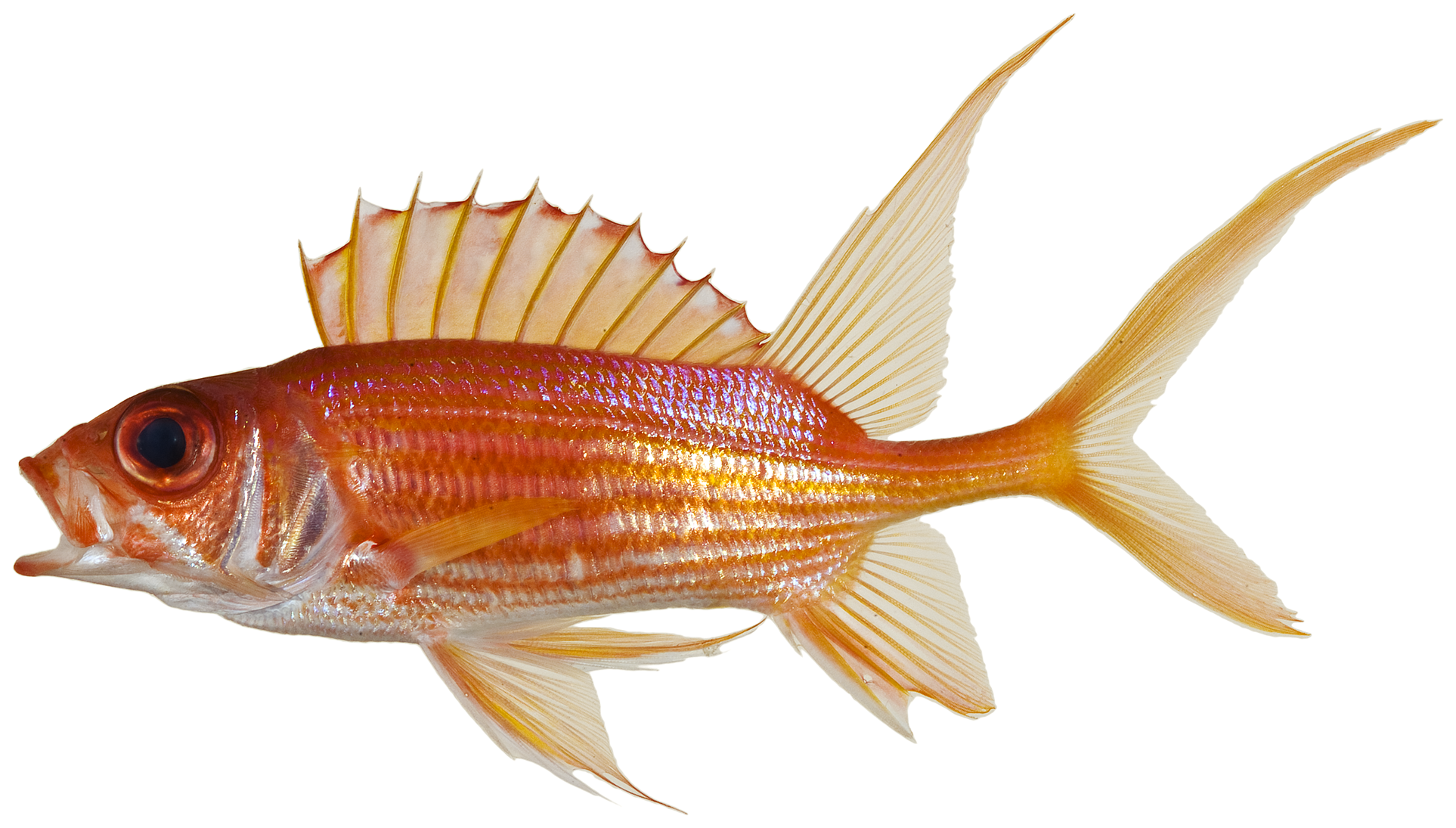
- Holocentrus rufus

Scientific classification
- Kingdom: Animalia
- Phylum: Chordata
- Class: Actinopterygii
- Order: Beryciformes
- Family: Holocentridae
- Subfamily: Holocentrinae; J. Richardson, 1846

Genera
- Holocentrus; Neoniphon; Sargocentron

= Holocentrinae =

Holocentrinae Temporal range: Early Eocene to present

Subfamily of fishes

Holocentrinae is a subfamily of Holocentridae containing 40 recognized species and one proposed species. Its members are typically known as squirrelfish and all are nocturnal. All three genera in the subfamily are found in the Atlantic and Holocentrus is restricted to this ocean. Most species in genera Neoniphon and Sargocentron are from the Indo-Pacific region and several of these occur in the Indian Ocean west of the southern tip of India. A fossil genus of the subfamily is Eoholocentrum from the Early Eocene of Italy.

A rare example of the fish is featured in Ian Fleming's 1960 James Bond short story "The Hildebrand Rarity".
