= Holocentridae =

Holocentridae Temporal range: Late Cretaceous–Recent
- Neoniphon argenteus, Myripristis violacea, and Myripristis murdjan

Scientific classification
- Kingdom: Animalia
- Phylum: Chordata
- Class: Actinopterygii
- Division: Teleostei
- Order: Beryciformes
- Suborder: Holocentroidei
- Family: Holocentridae; J. Richardson, 1846

Subfamilies and genera
- Holocentrinae; Holocentrus; Neoniphon; Sargocentron; Myripristinae; Corniger; Myripristis; Ostichthys; Plectrypops; Pristilepis

Family of ray-finned fishes

Holocentridae is a family of beryciform ray-finned fish, the only family of the suborder Holocentroidei. The members of the subfamily Holocentrinae are typically known as squirrelfish, while the members of Myripristinae typically are known as soldierfish. In Hawaii, they are known by the Japanese name mempachi/menpachi (メンパチ) or the Hawaiian ʻūʻū.

They are found in tropical parts of the Indian, Pacific and Atlantic Oceans, with the greatest species richness near reefs in the Indo-Pacific. Most are found at depths from the shoreline to 100 m (330 ft), but some, notably the members of the genus Ostichthys, are generally found far deeper. Being largely or entirely nocturnal, they have relatively large eyes. During the day, they typically remain hidden in crevices, caves, or under ledges. Red and silvery colours dominate. The preopercle spines (near the gill opening) of the members of the subfamily Holocentrinae are venomous, and can give painful wounds. Most have a maximum length of 15–35 cm (6–14 in), but Sargocentron iota barely reaches 8 cm (3 in), and S. spiniferum and Holocentrus adscensionis can reach more than 50 cm (19.5 in). The squirrelfishes mainly feed on small fishes and benthic invertebrates, while the soldierfishes typically feed on zooplankton. The larvae are pelagic, unlike the adults, and can be found far out to sea.

== Timeline ==
Definitive holocentroid fishes first appear in the earliest part of the Cenozoic and boast a modest fossil record.
