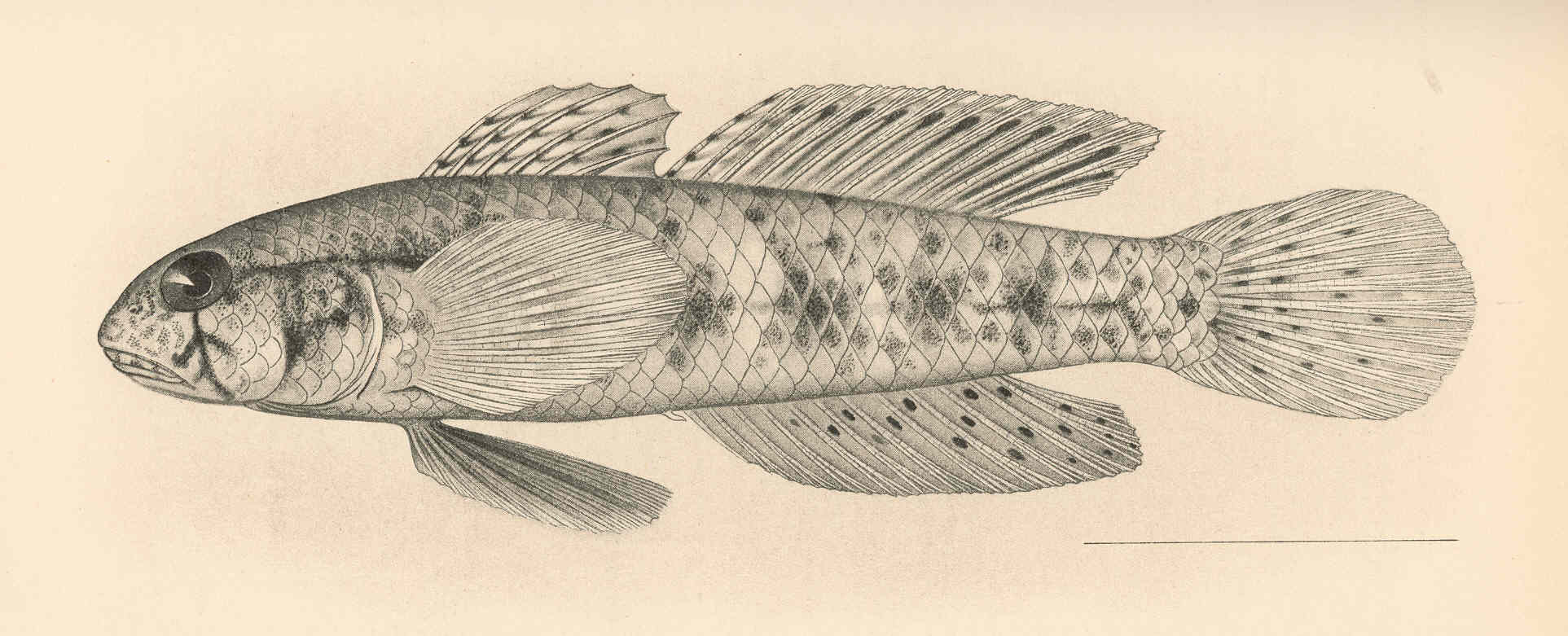

Scientific classification
- Kingdom: Animalia
- Phylum: Chordata
- Class: Actinopterygii
- Division: Teleostei
- Order: Gobiiformes
- Family: Oxudercidae
- Genus: Gnatholepis
- Species: G. knighti

Binomial name
- Gnatholepis knighti D. S. Jordan & Evermann, 1903

= Gnatholepis knighti =

Species of fish

Gnatholepis knighti, the eyebar goby, is a small species of ray-finned fish in the subfamily Gobionellinae. It is endemic to the Hawaiian Islands.

== Taxonomy and history ==
Gnatholepis knighti was first described as a species by David Starr Jordan and Barton Warren Evermann in 1903 using specimens collected from Hawaiian Islands. The identification of the species later became confused with Gnatholepis anjerensis. In 2004, Christine Thacker studied Gnatholepis specimens using mitochondrial DNA along with physical characteristics to better understand the relationships between species in the genus. Her research supported recognizing the Hawaiian G. knighti as a distinct species. Eldredge (2006) also discussed the identification of the Hawaiian species and the change from identifying these fish as G. anjerensis to G. knighti.

=== Type specimens ===
The original holotype used to describe Gnatholepis knighti is no longer known to exist, but some of the paratypes have been preserved in museum collections. One surviving paratype is kept at Harvard University's Museum of Comparative Zoology under the catalog number MCZ Ichthyology 28902. According to the museum record, this specimen was collected in Hilo, Hawaiʻi, in 1901 and is associated with Jordan and Evermann's 1903 description of the species.
