= Gnatholepis pascuensis =

Scientific classification
- Kingdom: Animalia
- Phylum: Chordata
- Class: Actinopterygii
- Order: Gobiiformes
- Family: Oxudercidae
- Genus: Gnatholepis
- Species: G. pascuensis

Binomial name
- Gnatholepis pascuensis Randall and Greenfield, 2001

Species of fish

Gnatholepis pascuensis, the Rapa Nui goby, is a species of ray-finned fish in the subfamily Gobionellinae. It is endemic to Easter Island.

Gnatholepis pascuensis was originally described as a subspecies of Gnatholepis cauerensis, but it was elevated to full species status in 2009.
