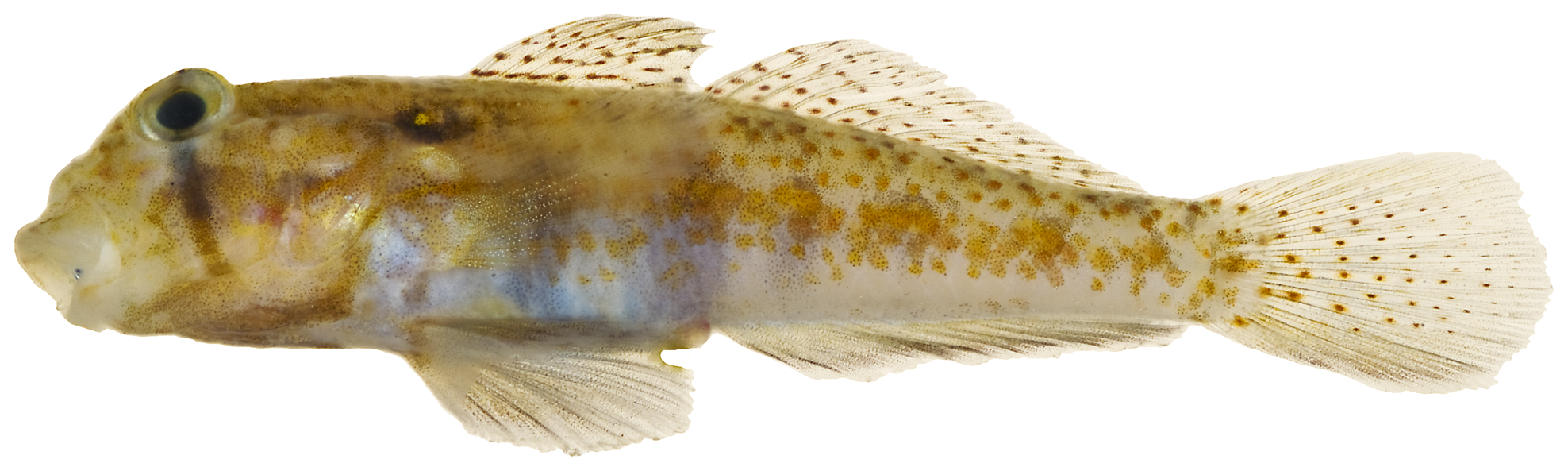
- Gnatholepis thompsoni

Scientific classification
- Kingdom: Animalia
- Phylum: Chordata
- Class: Actinopterygii
- Order: Gobiiformes
- Family: Oxudercidae
- Subfamily: Gobionellinae
- Genus: Gnatholepis; Bleeker, 1874

Type species
- Gobius anjerensis Bleeker, 1851

Species
- 10

= Gnatholepis =

Genus of fishes

Gnatholepis is a genus of fish in the family Gobiidae, the gobies. It is the only marine genus in the subfamily Gobionellinae, which otherwise includes mostly estuary-dwelling and freshwater fish. Gnatholepis are tropical fish associated with sandy habitat around corals.

== Species ==
There are currently 10 recognized species in this genus.

Species include:

- Gnatholepis anjerensis (Bleeker, 1851) (eye-bar goby)
- Gnatholepis argus Larson & Buckle, 2005
- Gnatholepis caudimaculata Larson & Buckle, 2012
- Gnatholepis cauerensis (Bleeker, 1853) (eyebar goby)
- Gnatholepis gymnocara J. E. Randall & D. W. Greenfield, 2001
- Gnatholepis knighti D. S. Jordan & Evermann, 1903
- Gnatholepis ophthalmotaenia (Bleeker, 1854)
- Gnatholepis pascuensis J. E. Randall & D. W. Greenfield, 2001 (Rapanui goby)
- Gnatholepis thompsoni D. S. Jordan, 1904 (goldspot goby)
- Gnatholepis yoshinoi T. Suzuki & J. E. Randall, 2009 (Yoshino's goby)
