= Gnatholepis gymnocara =

Scientific classification
- Kingdom: Animalia
- Phylum: Chordata
- Class: Actinopterygii
- Order: Gobiiformes
- Family: Oxudercidae
- Genus: Gnatholepis
- Species: G. gymnocara

Binomial name
- Gnatholepis gymnocara (Randall & Greenfield, 2001)

Species of fish

Gnatholepis gymnocara, the Nakedcheek sandgoby, is a small species of ray-finned fish in the subfamily Gobionellinae. The Naked cheek sandgoby is found primarily in the Indian Ocean along the coast of Australia .

== Description ==
The "naked cheeks," which serve as the namesake of this species, are one of the most diagnostic features of the Nakedcheek sandgoby. Scales are totally absent on the cheek and operculum, back to the predorsal midline, though there are a few typical cycloid scales on the base of the pectoral fin and on the breast. While a small fold might be present on the end of the lower lip, there is no truly distinct flap on the lower lip, which is also common in other goby species. There are also no teeth with are distinctly larger than the rest of the dentition.

=== Size and coloration ===
Males of this species reach a maximum length of 3.7 cm in total length. Their bodies are pale tan/dusky with a 6 darker dusky blotches, and a row of horizontal spots and streaks. There is also an irregular dark, cross-shaped blotch on each cheek that extends downward from the eye. There is a small brown spot at the base of the caudal fin that is approximately the width of the pupil. Males also have a small dark spot at the base of the first dorsal fin, while females lack this feature.

== Distribution and habitat ==
The Nakedcheek sandgoby is found in the western Pacific Ocean, specifically Australia. It can be found in shallow, nearshore marine environments between 0 and 1m in depth. Specimens are typically collected from around 0.5m deep and, while most are found in marine waters, at least one has been collected from a brackish habitat.
