= Gnatholepis ophthalmotaenia =

Scientific classification
- Kingdom: Animalia
- Phylum: Chordata
- Class: Actinopterygii
- Order: Gobiiformes
- Family: Oxudercidae
- Genus: Gnatholepis
- Species: G. ophthalmotaenia

Binomial name
- Gnatholepis ophthalmotaenia (Bleeker, 1854)

Species of fish

Gnatholepis ophthalmotaenia is a small species of ray-finned fish in the subfamily Gobionellinae. It is known from the eastern Indian Ocean and western Pacific.
