= Gnatholepis cauerensis =

Scientific classification
- Kingdom: Animalia
- Phylum: Chordata
- Class: Actinopterygii
- Order: Gobiiformes
- Family: Oxudercidae
- Genus: Gnatholepis
- Species: G. cauerensis

Binomial name
- Gnatholepis cauerensis (Bleeker, 1853)

Species of fish

Gnatholepis cauerensis is a small species of ray-finned fish in the subfamily Gobionellinae. It is known from the Indo-Pacific.
