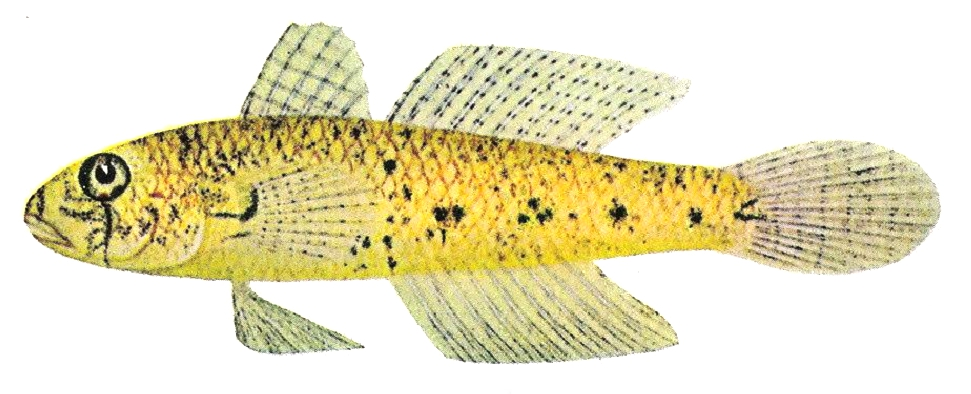

Scientific classification
- Kingdom: Animalia
- Phylum: Chordata
- Class: Actinopterygii
- Order: Gobiiformes
- Family: Oxudercidae
- Genus: Gnatholepis
- Species: G. anjerensis

Binomial name
- Gnatholepis anjerensis (Bleeker, 1851)

= Gnatholepis anjerensis =

Species of fish

Gnatholepis anjerensis, the eyebar goby, is a small species of ray-finned fish in the subfamily Gobionellinae. It is native to the Indo-Pacific.

It was first described by Dutch ichthyologist, Pieter Bleeker, in 1851.
