= List of sharks =

Identification of the 8 extant shark orders

Shark is the naming term of all members of Selachimorpha suborder in the subclass Elasmobranchii, in the class Chondrichthyes. The Elasmobranchii also include rays and skates; the Chondrichthyes also include Chimaeras. The first shark-like chondrichthyans appeared in the oceans more than 450 million years ago, developing into the crown group of sharks by the Early Jurassic.

Listed below are extant species of shark. Sharks are spread across 557 described and 23 undescribed species in eight orders. The families and genera within the orders are listed in alphabetical order. Also included is a field guide to place sharks into the correct order.

== Cow and frilled sharks (2 Families) ==
- ORDER HEXANCHIFORMES
  - Family Chlamydoselachidae (frilled sharks)
    - Genus Chlamydoselachus Garman, 1884
      - Chlamydoselachus africana Ebert & L. J. V. Compagno, 2009 (Southern African frilled shark)
      - Chlamydoselachus anguineus Garman, 1884 (frilled shark)
  - Family Hexanchidae (cow sharks)
    - Genus Heptranchias Rafinesque, 1810
      - Heptranchias perlo (Bonnaterre, 1788) (sharp-nose seven-gill shark)
    - Genus Hexanchus Rafinesque, 1810
      - Hexanchus griseus (Bonnaterre, 1788) (blunt-nose six-gill shark)
      - Hexanchus nakamurai Teng, 1962 (big-eyed six-gill shark)
      - Hexanchus vitulus Springer and Waller, 1969 (Atlantic six-gill shark)
    - Genus Notorynchus Ayres, 1855
      - Notorynchus cepedianus (Péron, 1807) (broad-nose seven-gill shark)

== Dogfish sharks (7 families) ==
- ORDER SQUALIFORMES
  - Family Centrophoridae (gulper sharks)
    - Genus Centrophorus J. P. Müller & Henle, 1837
      - Centrophorus atromarginatus Garman, 1913 (dwarf gulper shark)
      - Centrophorus granulosus Bloch & J. G. Schneider, 1801 (gulper shark)
      - Centrophorus harrissoni McCulloch, 1915 (dumb gulper shark)
      - Centrophorus lesliei White, 2017 (African gulper shark)
      - Centrophorus longipinnis White, 2017 (Longfin gulper shark)
      - Centrophorus moluccensis Bleeker, 1860 (small-fin gulper shark)
      - Centrophorus seychellorum Baranes, 2003 (Seychelles gulper shark)
      - Centrophorus squamosus Bonnaterre, 1788 (leaf-scale gulper shark)
      - Centrophorus tessellatus Garman, 1906 (mosaic gulper shark)
      - Centrophorus uyato Rafinesque, 1810 (little gulper shark)
      - Centrophorus westraliensis W. T. White, Ebert & Compagno, 2008) (western gulper shark)
      - Centrophorus zeehaani W. T. White, Ebert & L. J. V. Compagno, 2008 (southern dogfish)
      - Centrophorus sp. A Not yet described (mini gulper shark)
      - Centrophorus sp. B Not yet described (slender gulper shark)
    - Genus Deania D. S. Jordan & Snyder, 1902
      - Deania calcea R. T. Lowe, 1839 (bird-beak dogfish)
      - Deania hystricosa Garman, 1906 (rough long-nose dogfish)
      - Deania profundorum H. M. Smith & Radcliffe, 1912 (arrow-head dogfish)
      - Deania quadrispinosa McCulloch, 1915 (long-snout dogfish)
  - Family Dalatiidae (kite-fin sharks)
    - Genus Dalatias Rafinesque, 1810
      - Dalatias licha Bonnaterre, 1788 (kite-fin shark)
    - Genus Euprotomicroides Hulley & M. J. Penrith, 1966
      - Euprotomicroides zantedeschia Hulley & M. J. Penrith, 1966 (tail-light shark)
    - Genus Euprotomicrus T. N. Gill, 1865
      - Euprotomicrus bispinatus Quoy & Gaimard, 1824 (pygmy shark)
    - Genus Heteroscymnoides Fowler, 1934
      - Heteroscymnoides marleyi Fowler 1934 (long-nose pygmy shark)
    - Genus Isistius T. N. Gill, 1865
      - Isistius brasiliensis Quoy & Gaimard, 1824 (cookiecutter shark)
      - Isistius plutodus Garrick & S. Springer, 1964 (Large-tooth cookiecutter shark)
    - Genus Mollisquama Dolganov, 1984
      - Mollisquama parini Dolganov, 1984 (pocket shark)
      - Mollisquama mississippiensis Grace, 2019 (American pocket shark)
    - Genus Squaliolus H. M. Smith & Radcliffe, 1912
      - Squaliolus aliae Teng, 1959 (small-eye pygmy shark)
      - Squaliolus laticaudus H. M. Smith & Radcliffe, 1912 (spined pygmy shark)
  - Family Echinorhinidae (bramble sharks)
    - Genus Echinorhinus T. N. Gill, 1862
      - Echinorhinus brucus Bonnaterre, 1788 (bramble shark)
      - Echinorhinus cookei Pietschmann, 1928 (prickly shark)
  - Family Etmopteridae (lantern sharks)
    - Genus Aculeola F. de Buen, 1959
      - Aculeola nigra F. de Buen, 1959 (hook-tooth dogfish)
    - Genus Centroscyllium J. P. Müller & Henle, 1841
      - Centroscyllium excelsum Shirai & Nakaya, 1990 (high-fin dogfish)
      - Centroscyllium fabricii J. C. H. Reinhardt, 1825 (black dogfish)
      - Centroscyllium granulatum Günther, 1887 (granular dogfish)
      - Centroscyllium kamoharai T. Abe, 1966 (bare-skin dogfish)
      - Centroscyllium nigrum Garman, 1899 (comb-tooth dogfish)
      - Centroscyllium ornatum Alcock, 1889 (ornate dogfish)
      - Centroscyllium ritteri D. S. Jordan & Fowler, 1903 (white-fin dogfish)
    - Genus Etmopterus Rafinesque, 1810
      - Etmopterus alphus Ebert, 2016 (Whitecheek lanternshark)
      - Etmopterus baxteri Garrick, 1957 (New Zealand lanternshark)
      - Etmopterus benchleyi V. E. Vásquez, Ebert & Long, 2015 (ninja lanternshark)
      - Etmopterus bigelowi Shirai & Tachikawa, 1993 (blurred lanternshark)
      - Etmopterus brachyurus Hugh McCormick Smith|H. M. Smith & Lewis Radcliffe|Radcliffe, 1912 (short-tail lanternshark)
      - Etmopterus brosei Ebert, 2021 (Barrie's lanternshark)
      - Etmopterus bullisi Bigelow & Schroeder, 1957 (lined lanternshark)
      - Etmopterus burgessi Schaaf-Da Silva & Ebert, 2006 (broad-snout lanternshark)
      - Etmopterus carteri S. Springer & G. H. Burgess, 1985 (cylindrical lanternshark)
      - Etmopterus caudistigmus Last, G. H. Burgess & Séret, 2002 (tail-spot lanternshark)
      - Etmopterus compagnoi R. Fricke & Koch, 1990 (Compagno's lanternshark)
      - Etmopterus decacuspidatus W. L. Y. Chan, 1966 (comb-tooth lanternshark)
      - Etmopterus dianthus Last, G. H. Burgess & Séret, 2002 (pink lanternshark)
      - Etmopterus dislineatus Last, G. H. Burgess & Séret, 2002 (Lined lanternshark)
      - Etmopterus evansi Last, G. H. Burgess & Séret, 2002 (Black-mouth lanternshark)
      - Etmopterus fusus Last, G. H. Burgess & Séret, 2002 (pygmy lanternshark)
      - Etmopterus gracilispinis G. Krefft, 1968 (broad-band lanternshark)
      - Etmopterus granulosus Günther, 1880 (southern lanternshark)
      - Etmopterus hillianus Poey, 1861 (Caribbean lanternshark)
      - Etmopterus joungi Knuckey, Ebert & G. H. Burgess, 2011 (short-fin smooth lanternshark)
      - Etmopterus lailae Ebert, 2017 (Laila's lanternshark)
      - Etmopterus litvinovi Parin & Kotlyar, 1990 (small-eye lanternshark)
      - Etmopterus lucifer D. S. Jordan & Snyder, 1902 (Black-belly lanternshark)
      - Etmopterus marshae Ebert, 2018 (Marsha's lanternshark)
      - Etmopterus molleri Whitley, 1939 (Moller's lanternshark)
      - Etmopterus perryi S. Springer & G. H. Burgess, 1985 (dwarf lanternshark)
      - Etmopterus polli Bigelow, Schroeder & S. Springer, 1953 (African lanternshark)
      - Etmopterus princeps Collett, 1904 (great lanternshark)
      - Etmopterus pseudosqualiolus Last, G. H. Burgess & Séret, 2002 (False lanternshark)
      - Etmopterus pusillus R. T. Lowe, 1839 (smooth lanternshark)
      - Etmopterus pycnolepis Kotlyar, 1990 (dense-scale lanternshark)
      - Etmopterus robinsi Schofield & G. H. Burgess, 1997 (West Indian lanternshark)
      - Etmopterus samadiae White, 2017 (Papuan lanternshark)
      - Etmopterus schultzi Bigelow, Schroeder & S. Springer, 1953 (fringe-fin lanternshark)
      - Etmopterus sculptus Ebert, L. J. V. Compagno & De Vries, 2011 (sculpted lanternshark)
      - Etmopterus sentosus Bass, D'Aubrey & Kistnasamy, 1976 (thorny lanternshark)
      - Etmopterus sheikoi Dolganov, 1986 (rasp-tooth dogfish)
      - Etmopterus spinax Linnaeus, 1758 (velvet-belly lanternshark)
      - Etmopterus splendidus Ka. Yano, 1988 (splendid lanternshark)
      - Etmopterus unicolor Engelhardt, 1912 (bristled lanternshark)
      - Etmopterus viator Straube, 2011 (traveller lanternshark)
      - Etmopterus villosus C. H. Gilbert, 1905 (Hawaiian lanternshark)
      - Etmopterus virens Bigelow, Schroeder & S. Springer, 1953 (green lanternshark)
      - Etmopterus westraliensis Ng, White, Liu & Joung, 2025 (West Australian lanternshark)
      - Etmopterus sp. Not yet described (Guadalupe lanternshark)
      - Etmopterus sp. Not yet described (Chilean lanternshark)
      - Etmopterus sp. Not yet described (Papua short-tail lanternshark)
    - Genus Trigonognathus Mochizuki & F. Ohe, 1990
      - Trigonognathus kabeyai Mochizuki & F. Ohe, 1990 (viper dogfish)
  - Family Oxynotidae (rough sharks)
    - Genus Oxynotus Rafinesque, 1810
      - Oxynotus bruniensis J. D. Ogilby, 1893 (prickly dogfish)
      - Oxynotus caribbaeus Cervigón, 1961 (Caribbean roughshark)
      - Oxynotus centrina Linnaeus, 1758 (angular roughshark)
      - Oxynotus japonicus Ka. Yano & Murofushi, 1985 (Japanese roughshark)
      - Oxynotus paradoxus Frade, 1929 (sail-fin roughshark)
  - Family Somniosidae (sleeper sharks)
    - Genus Centroscymnus Barbosa du Bocage & Brito Capello, 1864
      - Centroscymnus coelolepis Barbosa du Bocage & Brito Capello, 1864 (Portuguese dogfish)
      - Centroscymnus owstonii Garman, 1906 (rough-skin dogfish)
    - Genus Centroselachus Garman, 1913
      - Centroselachus crepidater Barbosa du Bocage & Brito Capello, 1864 (long-nose velvet dogfish)
    - Genus Scymnodalatias Garrick, 1956
      - Scymnodalatias albicauda Taniuchi & Garrick, 1986 (white-tail dogfish)
      - Scymnodalatias garricki Kukuev & Konovalenko, 1988 (Azores dogfish)
      - Scymnodalatias oligodon Kukuev & Konovalenko, 1988 (sparse-tooth dogfish)
      - Scymnodalatias sherwoodi Archey, 1921 (Sherwood's dogfish)
    - Genus Scymnodon Barbosa du Bocage & Brito Capello, 1864
      - Scymnodon ichiharai Ka. Yano & S. Tanaka (II), 1984 (Japanese velvet dogfish)
      - Scymnodon macracanthus Regan, 1906 (large-spine velvet dogfish)
      - Scymnodon plunketi Waite, 1910 (Plunket shark)
      - Scymnodon ringens Barbosa du Bocage & Brito Capello, 1864 (knife-tooth dogfish)
    - Genus Somniosus

Lesueur, 1818

      - Somniosus antarcticus Whitley, 1939 (southern sleeper shark)
      - Somniosus cheni Hsu, 2020 (Taiwan sleeper shark)
      - Somniosus longus S. Tanaka (I), 1912 (frog shark)
      - Somniosus microcephalus Bloch & J. G. Schneider, 1801 (Greenland shark)
      - Somniosus pacificus Bigelow & Schroeder, 1944 (Pacific sleeper shark)
      - Somniosus rostratus A. Risso, 1827 (little sleeper shark)
      - Somniosus sp. A Not yet described (long-nose sleeper shark)
    - Genus Zameus D. S. Jordan & Fowler, 1903
      - Zameus squamulosus Günther, 1877 (velvet dogfish)
  - Family Squalidae (dogfish sharks)
    - Genus Cirrhigaleus S. Tanaka (I), 1912
      - Cirrhigaleus asper Merrett, 1973 (rough-skin spurdog)
      - Cirrhigaleus australis W. T. White, Last & J. D. Stevens, 2007 (southern Mandarin dogfish)
      - Cirrhigaleus barbifer S. Tanaka (I), 1912 (Mandarin dogfish)
    - Genus Squalus Linnaeus, 1758
      - Squalus acanthias Linnaeus, 1758 (spiny dogfish)
      - Squalus acutipinnis Regan, 1908 (blunt-nose spiny dogfish)
      - Squalus albicaudus Viana, 2016 (Brazilian Whitetail Dogfish)
      - Squalus albifrons Last, W. T. White & J. D. Stevens, 2007 (eastern high-fin spurdog)
      - Squalus altipinnis Last, W. T. White & J. D. Stevens, 2007 (western high-fin spurdog)
      - Squalus bahiensis Viana, 2016 (Northeastern Brazilian dogfish)
      - Squalus bassi Viana, 2017 (Long-nosed African spurdog)
      - Squalus blainville A. Risso, 1827 (long-nose spurdog)
      - Squalus boretzi Boretzi's dogfish (Boretzi dogfish)
      - Squalus brevirostris S. Tanaka (I), 1917 (Japanese short-nose spurdog)
      - Squalus bucephalus Last, Séret & Pogonoski, 2007 (big-head spurdog)
      - Squalus chloroculus Last, W. T. White & Motomura, 2007 (green-eye spurdog)
      - Squalus clarkae Pfleger, Grubbs, Cotton & Daly-Engel, 2018 (gulf dogfish)
      - Squalus crassispinus Last, Edmunds & Yearsley, 2007 (fat-spine spurdog)
      - Squalus cubensis Howell-Rivero, 1936 (Cuban dogfish)
      - Squalus edmundsi W. T. White, Last & J. D. Stevens, 2007 (Edmund's spurdog)
      - Squalus formosus W. T. White & Iglésias, 2011 (Taiwan spurdog)
      - Squalus grahami W. T. White, Last & J. D. Stevens, 2007 (eastern long-nose spurdog)
      - Squalus griffini Phillipps, 1931 (northern spiny dogfish)
      - Squalus hawaiiensis Daly-Engel, 2018 (Hawaiian Dogfish)
      - Squalus hemipinnis W. T. White, Last & Yearsley, 2007 (Indonesian short-snout spurdog)
      - Squalus japonicus Ishikawa, 1908 (Japanese spurdog)
      - Squalus lalannei Baranes, 2003 (Seychelles spurdog)
      - Squalus lobularis Viana, 2016 (Atlantic lobefin dogfish)
      - Squalus mahia Viana, 2017 (Malagasy skinny spurdog)
      - Squalus margaretsmithae Viana, 2017 (Smith's dogfish)
      - Squalus megalops W. J. Macleay, 1881 (short-nose spurdog)
      - Squalus melanurus Fourmanoir & Rivaton, 1979 (black-tailed spurdog)
      - Squalus mitsukurii D. S. Jordan & Snyder, 1903 (short-spine spurdog)
      - Squalus montalbani Whitley, 1931 (Indonesian greeneye spurdog)
      - Squalus nasutus Last, L. J. Marshall & W. T. White, 2007 (western long-nose spurdog)
      - Squalus notocaudatus Last, W. T. White & J. D. Stevens, 2007 (bar-tail spurdog)
      - Squalus quasimodo Viana, 2016 (Humpback dogfish)
      - Squalus rancureli Fourmanoir & Rivaton, 1979 (Cyrano spurdog)
      - Squalus raoulensis C. A. J. Duffy & Last, 2007 (Kermadec spiny dogfish)
      - Squalus shiraii Viana, 2020 (Shirai's spurdog)
      - Squalus suckleyi Girard, 1854 (Pacific spiny dogfish)
      - Squalus sp. Not yet described (Lombok high-fin spurdog)

== Sawsharks (1 family) ==
- ORDER PRISTIOPHORIFORMES
  - Family Pristiophoridae (sawsharks)
    - Genus Pliotrema Regan, 1906
      - Pliotrema annae Weigmann, Gon, Leeney & Temple, 2020 (Anna's sixgill sawshark)
      - Pliotrema kajae Weigmann, Gon, Leeney & Temple, 2020 (Kaja's sixgill sawshark)
      - Pliotrema warreni Regan, 1906 (six-gill sawshark)
    - Genus Pristiophorus J. P. Müller & Henle, 1837
      - Pristiophorus cirratus (Latham, 1794) (long-nose sawshark)
      - Pristiophorus delicatus Yearsley, Last & W. T. White, 2008 (tropical sawshark)
      - Pristiophorus japonicus Günther, 1870 (Japanese sawshark)
      - Pristiophorus lanae Ebert & Wilms, 2013 (Lana's sawshark)
      - Pristiophorus nancyae Ebert & Cailliet, 2011 (African dwarf sawshark)
      - Pristiophorus nudipinnis Günther, 1870 (short-nose sawshark)
      - Pristiophorus schroederi S. Springer & Bullis, 1960 (Bahamas sawshark)

== Angel sharks (1 family) ==
- ORDER SQUATINIFORMES
  - Family Squatinidae (angel sharks)
    - Genus Squatina A. M. C. Duméril, 1806
      - Squatina aculeata G. Cuvier, 1829 (saw-back angelshark)
      - Squatina africana Regan, 1908 (African angelshark)
      - Squatina albipunctata Last & W. T. White, 2008 (eastern angelshark)
      - Squatina argentina (Marini, 1930) (Argentine angelshark)
      - Squatina armata (Philippi {Krumweide}, 1887) (Chilean angelshark)
      - Squatina australis Regan, 1906 (Australian angelshark)
      - Squatina caillieti J. H. Walsh, Ebert & L. J. V. Compagno, 2011 (Philippines angelshark)
      - Squatina californica Ayres, 1859 (Pacific angelshark)
      - Squatina david Acero, 2016 (David's angelshark)
      - Squatina dumeril Lesueur, 1818 (Atlantic angelshark)
      - Squatina formosa S. C. Shen & W. H. Ting, 1972 (Taiwan angelshark)
      - Squatina guggenheim Marini, 1936 (angular angelshark)
      - Squatina heteroptera Castro-Aguirre, Espinoza-Pérez & Huidobro-Campos, 2007 (disparate angelshark)
      - Squatina japonica Bleeker, 1858 (Japanese angelshark)
      - Squatina leae Weigmann, 2023 (Lea's angelshark)
      - Squatina legnota Last & W. T. White, 2008 (Indonesian angelshark)
      - Squatina mapama Long, Ebert, Tavera, Pizarro & Robertson, 2021 (short-crested angelshark)
      - Squatina mexicana Castro-Aguirre, Espinoza-Pérez & Huidobro-Campos, 2007 (Mexican angelshark)
      - Squatina nebulosa Regan, 1906 (clouded angelshark)
      - Squatina occulta Vooren & K. G. da Silva, 1992 (hidden angelshark)
      - Squatina oculata Bonaparte, 1840 (smooth-back angelshark)
      - Squatina pseudocellata Last & W. T. White, 2008 (western angelshark)
      - Squatina squatina (Linnaeus, 1758) (angelshark)
      - Squatina tergocellata McCulloch, 1914 (ornate angelshark)
      - Squatina tergocellatoides J.S.T.F. Chen, 1963 (ocellated angelshark)
      - Squatina varii Vaz, 2018 (Vari's angelshark)

== Bullhead sharks (1 family) ==
- ORDER HETERODONTIFORMES
  - Family Heterodontidae (bullhead sharks)
    - Genus Heterodontus Blainville, 1816
      - Heterodontus francisci (Girard, 1855) (horn shark)
      - Heterodontus galeatus (Günther, 1870) (crested bullhead shark)
      - Heterodontus japonicus Maclay & W. J. Macleay, 1884 (Japanese bullhead shark)
      - Heterodontus marshallae White, Mollen, O'Neill, Yang, & Taylor, 2023 (Painted hornshark)
      - Heterodontus mexicanus L. R. Taylor & Castro-Aguirre, 1972 (Mexican hornshark)
      - Heterodontus omanensis Z. H. Baldwin, 2005 (Oman bullhead shark)
      - Heterodontus portusjacksoni (F. A. A. Meyer, 1793) (Port Jackson shark)
      - Heterodontus quoyi (Fréminville, 1840) (Galapagos bullhead shark)
      - Heterodontus ramalheira (J. L. B. Smith, 1949) (white-spotted bullhead shark)
      - Heterodontus zebra (J. E. Gray, 1831) (zebra bullhead shark)
      - Heterodontus sp. X Not yet described (cryptic hornshark)

== Mackerel sharks (7 families) ==
- ORDER LAMNIFORMES
  - Family Alopiidae (thresher sharks)
    - Genus Alopias Rafinesque, 1810
      - Alopias pelagicus Nakamura, 1935 (pelagic thresher shark)
      - Alopias superciliosus R. T. Lowe, 1841 (big-eye thresher shark)
      - Alopias vulpinus (Bonnaterre, 1788) (thresher shark)
  - Family Cetorhinidae (basking sharks)
    - Genus Cetorhinus Blainville, 1816
      - Cetorhinus maximus (Gunnerus, 1765) (basking shark)
  - Family Lamnidae (mackerel sharks)
    - Genus Carcharodon A. Smith, 1838
      - Carcharodon carcharias (Linnaeus, 1758) (great white shark)
    - Genus Isurus Rafinesque, 1810
      - Isurus oxyrinchus Rafinesque, 1810 (short-fin mako)
      - Isurus paucus Guitart-Manday, 1966 (long-fin mako)
    - Genus Lamna G. Cuvier, 1816
      - Lamna ditropis C. L. Hubbs & Follett, 1947 (salmon shark)
      - Lamna nasus (Bonnaterre, 1788) (porbeagle shark)
  - Family Megachasmidae (megamouth sharks)
    - Genus Megachasma L. R. Taylor, . J. V. Compagno & Struhsaker, 1983
      - Megachasma pelagios L. R. Taylor, L. J. V. Compagno & Struhsaker, 1983 (megamouth shark)
  - Family Mitsukurinidae (goblin sharks)
    - Genus Mitsukurina D. S. Jordan, 1898
      - Mitsukurina owstoni D. S. Jordan, 1898 (goblin shark)
  - Family Carchariidae (sand tiger sharks)
    - Genus Carcharias Rafinesque, 1810
      - Carcharias taurus Rafinesque, 1810 (sand tiger shark)
  - Family Odontaspididae (sand sharks)
    - Genus Odontaspis Agassiz, 1838
      - Odontaspis ferox (A. Risso, 1810) (smalltooth sand tiger)
      - Odontaspis noronhai (Maul, 1955) (bigeye sand tiger)
  - Family Pseudocarchariidae (crocodile sharks)
    - Genus Pseudocarcharias Cadenat, 1963
      - Pseudocarcharias kamoharai (Matsubara, 1936) (crocodile shark)

== Carpet sharks (7 families) ==
- ORDER ORECTOLOBIFORMES
  - Family Brachaeluridae (blind sharks)
    - Genus Brachaelurus J. D. Ogilby, 1908
      - Brachaelurus colcloughi J. D. Ogilby, 1908 (blue-grey carpetshark)
      - Brachaelurus waddi (Bloch & J. G. Schneider, 1801) (blind shark)
  - Family Ginglymostomatidae (nurse sharks)
    - Genus Ginglymostoma J. P. Müller & Henle, 1837
      - Ginglymostoma cirratum (Bonnaterre, 1788) (nurse shark)
      - Ginglymostoma unami Del-Moral-Flores, Ramírez-Antonio, Angulo & Pérez-Ponce de León, 2015 (Pacific nurse shark)
    - Genus Nebrius Rüppell, 1837
      - Nebrius ferrugineus (Lesson, 1831) (tawny nurse shark)
    - Genus Pseudoginglymostoma Dingerkus, 1986
      - Pseudoginglymostoma brevicaudatum (Günther, 1867) (short-tail nurse shark)
  - Family Hemiscylliidae (bamboo sharks)
    - Genus Chiloscyllium J. P. Müller & Henle, 1837
      - Chiloscyllium arabicum Gubanov, 1980 (Arabian carpetshark)
      - Chiloscyllium burmensis Dingerkus & DeFino, 1983 (Burmese bamboo shark)
      - Chiloscyllium griseum J. P. Müller & Henle, 1838 (grey bamboo shark)
      - Chiloscyllium hasselti Bleeker, 1852 (Hasselt's bamboo shark)
      - Chiloscyllium indicum (J. F. Gmelin, 1789) (slender bamboo shark)
      - Chiloscyllium plagiosum (Anonymous, referred to E. T. Bennett, 1830) (white-spotted bamboo shark)
      - Chiloscyllium punctatum J. P. Müller & Henle, 1838 (brown-banded bamboo shark)
    - Genus Hemiscyllium J. P. Müller & Henle, 1837
      - Hemiscyllium freycineti (Quoy & Gaimard, 1824) (Indonesian speckled carpetshark)
      - Hemiscyllium galei G. R. Allen & Erdmann, 2008 (Cenderawasih epaulette shark)
      - Hemiscyllium hallstromi |Whitley, 1967 (Papuan epaulette shark)
      - Hemiscyllium halmahera G. R. Allen, Erdmann & Dudgeon, 2013 (Halmahera epaulette shark)
      - Hemiscyllium henryi G. R. Allen & Erdmann, 2008 (Triton epaulette shark)
      - Hemiscyllium michaeli G. R. Allen & Dudgeon, 2010 (leopard epaulette shark)
      - Hemiscyllium ocellatum (Bonnaterre, 1788) (Epaulette shark)
      - Hemiscyllium strahani Whitley, 1967 (hooded carpetshark)
      - Hemiscyllium trispeculare J. Richardson, 1843 (speckled carpetshark)
      - Hemiscyllium sp. Not yet described (Seychelles carpetshark)
  - Family Orectolobidae (Wobbegong sharks)
    - Genus Eucrossorhinus Regan, 1908
      - Eucrossorhinus dasypogon (Bleeker, 1867) (tasselled wobbegong)
    - Genus Orectolobus Bonaparte, 1834
      - Orectolobus floridus Last & Chidlow, 2008 (floral banded wobbegong)
      - Orectolobus halei Whitley, 1940 (banded wobbegong)
      - Orectolobus hutchinsi Last, Chidlow & L. J. V. Compagno, 2006 (western wobbegong)
      - Orectolobus japonicus Regan, 1906 (Japanese wobbegong)
      - Orectolobus leptolineatus Last, Pogonoski & W. T. White, 2010 (Indonesian wobbegong)
      - Orectolobus maculatus (Bonnaterre, 1788) (spotted wobbegong)
      - Orectolobus ornatus (De Vis, 1883) (ornate wobbegong)
      - Orectolobus parvimaculatus Last & Chidlow, 2008 (dwarf spotted wobbegong)
      - Orectolobus reticulatus Last, Pogonoski & W. T. White, 2008 (network wobbegong)
      - Orectolobus wardi Whitley, 1939 (northern wobbegong)
    - Genus Sutorectus Whitley, 1939
      - Sutorectus tentaculatus (W. K. H. Peters, 1864) (cobbler wobbegong)
  - Family Parascylliidae (collared carpetsharks)
    - Genus Cirrhoscyllium H. M. Smith & Radcliffe, 1913
      - Cirrhoscyllium expolitum H. M. Smith & Radcliffe, 1913 (barbel-throat carpetshark)
      - Cirrhoscyllium formosanum Teng, 1959 (Taiwan saddled carpetshark)
      - Cirrhoscyllium japonicum Kamohara, 1943 (saddle carpetshark)
    - Genus Parascyllium T. N. Gill, 1862
      - Parascyllium collare E. P. Ramsay & J. D. Ogilby, 1888 (collared carpetshark)
      - Parascyllium elongatum Last & J. D. Stevens, 2008 (elongated carpetshark)
      - Parascyllium ferrugineum McCulloch, 1911 (rusty carpetshark)
      - Parascyllium sparsimaculatum T. Goto & Last, 2002 (ginger carpetshark)
      - Parascyllium variolatum (A. H. A. Duméril, 1853) (necklace carpetshark)
  - Family Rhincodontidae (Whale sharks)
    - Genus Rhincodon A. Smith, 1828
      - Rhincodon typus A. Smith, 1828 (whale shark)
  - Family Stegostomatidae (zebra sharks)
    - Genus Stegostoma J. P. Müller & Henle, 1837
      - Stegostoma fasciatum (Hermann, 1783) (zebra shark)

== Ground sharks (10 families) ==
- ORDER CARCHARHINIFORMES
  - Family Carcharhinidae (requiem sharks)
    - Genus Carcharhinus Blainville, 1816
      - Carcharhinus acronotus (Poey, 1860) (black-nose shark)
      - Carcharhinus albimarginatus (Rüppell, 1837) (silver-tip shark)
      - Carcharhinus altimus (S. Springer, 1950) (big-nose shark)
      - Carcharhinus amblyrhynchoides (Whitley, 1934) (graceful shark)
      - Carcharhinus amblyrhynchos (Bleeker, 1856) (grey reef shark)
      - Carcharhinus amboinensis (J. P. Müller & Henle, 1839) (pig-eye shark)
      - Carcharhinus borneensis (Bleeker, 1858) (Borneo shark)
      - Carcharhinus brachyurus (Günther, 1870) (copper shark)
      - Carcharhinus brevipinna (J. P. Müller & Henle, 1839) (spinner shark)
      - Carcharhinus cautus (Whitley, 1945) (Nervous shark)
      - Carcharhinus cerdale C. H. Gilbert, 1898 (Pacific smalltail shark)
      - Carcharhinus coatesi (Whitley, 1939) (Coates' shark)
      - Carcharhinus dussumieri (J. P. Müller & Henle, 1839) (white-cheek shark)
      - Carcharhinus falciformis (J. P. Müller & Henle, 1839) (silky shark)
      - Carcharhinus fitzroyensis (Whitley, 1943) (creek whaler)
      - Carcharhinus galapagensis (Snodgrass & Heller, 1905) (Galapagos shark)
      - Carcharhinus hemiodon (J. P. Müller & Henle, 1839) (Pondicherry shark)
      - Carcharhinus humani W. T. White & Weigmann, 2014 (Human's whaler shark)
      - Carcharhinus isodon (J. P. Müller & Henle, 1839) (fine-tooth shark)
      - Carcharhinus leiodon Garrick, 1985 (smooth-tooth blacktip shark)
      - Carcharhinus leucas (J. P. Müller & Henle, 1839) (bull shark)
      - Carcharhinus limbatus (J. P. Müller & Henle, 1839) (black-tip shark)
      - Carcharhinus longimanus (Poey, 1861) (oceanic whitetip shark)
      - Carcharhinus macloti (J. P. Müller & Henle, 1839) (hard-nose shark)
      - Carcharhinus melanopterus (Quoy & Gaimard, 1824) (black-tip reef shark)
      - Carcharhinus obscurus (Lesueur, 1818) (dusky shark)
      - Carcharhinus obsoletus (White, Kyne, & Harris, 2019) (lost shark)
      - Carcharhinus perezi (Poey, 1876) (Caribbean reef shark)
      - Carcharhinus plumbeus (Nardo, 1827) (sandbar shark)
      - Carcharhinus porosus (Ranzani, 1839) (small-tail shark)
      - Carcharhinus sealei (Pietschmann, 1913) (black-spot shark)
      - Carcharhinus signatus (Poey, 1868) (night shark)
      - Carcharhinus sorrah (J. P. Müller & Henle, 1839) (spot-tail shark)
      - Carcharhinus tilstoni (Whitley, 1950) (Australian blacktip shark)
      - Carcharhinus tjutjot (Bleeker, 1852) (Indonesian whaler shark)
    - Genus Galeocerdo J. P. Müller & Henle, 1837
      - Galeocerdo cuvier (Péron & Lesueur, 1822) (tiger shark)
    - Genus Glyphis Agassiz, 1843
      - Glyphis gangeticus (J. P. Müller & Henle, 1839) (Ganges shark)
      - Glyphis garricki L. J. V. Compagno, W. T. White & Last, 2008 (northern river shark)
      - Glyphis glyphis (J. P. Müller & Henle, 1839) (spear-tooth shark)
      - Glyphis sp. Not yet described (Mukah river shark)
    - Genus Isogomphodon T. N. Gill, 1862
      - Isogomphodon oxyrhynchus (J. P. Müller & Henle, 1839) (dagger-nose shark)
    - Genus Lamiopsis T. N. Gill, 1862
      - Lamiopsis temmincki (J. P. Müller & Henle, 1839) (broad-fin shark)
      - Lamiopsis tephrodes (Fowler, 1905) (Borneo broadfin shark)
    - Genus Loxodon J. P. Müller & Henle, 1839
      - Loxodon macrorhinus J. P. Müller & Henle, 1839 (slit-eye shark)
    - Genus Nasolamia L. J. V. Compagno & Garrick, 1983
      - Nasolamia velox (C. H. Gilbert, 1898) (white-nose shark)
    - Genus Negaprion Whitley, 1940
      - Negaprion acutidens Rüppell, 1837) (sickle-fin lemon shark)
      - Negaprion brevirostris (Poey, 1868) (lemon shark)
    - Genus Prionace Cantor, 1849
      - Prionace glauca (Linnaeus, 1758) (blue shark)
    - Genus Rhizoprionodon Whitley, 1929
      - Rhizoprionodon acutus (Rüppell, 1837) (milk shark)
      - Rhizoprionodon lalandii (J. P. Müller & Henle, 1839) (Brazilian sharpnose shark)
      - Rhizoprionodon longurio (D. S. Jordan & C. H. Gilbert, 1882) (Pacific sharpnose shark)
      - Rhizoprionodon oligolinx V. G. Springer, 1964 (grey sharpnose shark)
      - Rhizoprionodon porosus (Poey, 1861) (Caribbean sharpnose shark)
      - Rhizoprionodon taylori (J. D. Ogilby, 1915) (Australian sharpnose shark)
      - Rhizoprionodon terraenovae (J. Richardson, 1836) (Atlantic sharpnose shark)
    - Genus Scoliodon J. P. Müller & Henle, 1838
      - Scoliodon laticaudus J. P. Müller & Henle, 1838 (spade-nose shark)
      - Scoliodon macrorhynchos (Bleeker, 1852) (Pacific spade-nose shark)
    - Genus Triaenodon J. P. Müller & Henle, 1837
      - Triaenodon obesus (Rüppell, 1837) (white-tip reef shark)
  - Family Hemigaleidae (weasel sharks)
    - Genus Chaenogaleus T. N. Gill, 1862
      - Chaenogaleus macrostoma (Bleeker, 1852) (hook-tooth shark)
    - Genus Hemigaleus Bleeker, 1852
      - Hemigaleus australiensis W. T. White, Last & L. J. V. Compagno, 2005 (Australian weasel shark)
      - Hemigaleus microstoma Bleeker, 1852 (sickle-fin weasel shark)
    - Genus Hemipristis Agassiz, 1843
      - Hemipristis elongata (Klunzinger, 1871) (snaggle-tooth shark)
    - Genus Paragaleus Budker, 1935
      - Paragaleus leucolomatus L. J. V. Compagno & Smale, 1985 (white-tip weasel shark)
      - Paragaleus pectoralis (Garman, 1906) (Atlantic weasel shark)
      - Paragaleus randalli L. J. V. Compagno, Krupp & K. E. Carpenter, 1996 (slender weasel shark)
      - Paragaleus tengi (J. S. T. F. Chen, 1963) (straight-tooth weasel shark)
  - Family Dichichthyidae (bristle catsharks)
    - Genus Dichichthys White, Stewart, O'Neill & Naylor, 2024
      - Dichichthys albimarginatus Séret & Last, 2007 (white-tip bristle shark)
      - Dichichthys bigus Séret & Last, 2007 (beige bristle shark)
      - Dichichthys melanobranchius (W. L. Y. Chan, 1966) (black-gill bristle shark)
      - Dichichthys nigripalatum (Fahmi & Ebert, 2018) (Indonesian bristle shark)
      - Dichichthys satoi (White, Stewart, O'Neill & Naylor, 2024) (roughback bristle shark)
  - Family Leptochariidae (barbeled houndsharks)
    - Genus Leptocharias A. Smith, 1838
      - Leptocharias smithii (J. P. Müller & Henle, 1839) (barbeled houndshark)
  - Family Pentachidae (deepsea catsharks)
    - Genus Apristurus Garman, 1913
      - Apristurus albisoma Nakaya & Séret, 1999 (white-bodied catshark)
      - Apristurus ampliceps Sasahara, K. Sato & Nakaya, 2008 (rough-skin catshark)
      - Apristurus aphyodes Nakaya & Stehmann, 1998 (white ghost catshark)
      - Apristurus australis K. Sato, Nakaya & Yorozu, 2008 (Pinocchio catshark)
      - Apristurus breviventralis Kawauchi, Weigmann & Nakaya, 2014 (short-belly catshark)
      - Apristurus brunneus (C. H. Gilbert, 1892) (brown catshark)
      - Apristurus bucephalus W. T. White, Last & Pogonoski, 2008 (big-head catshark)
      - Apristurus canutus S. Springer & Heemstra, 1979 (hoary catshark)
      - Apristurus exsanguis K. Sato, Nakaya & A. L. Stewart, 1999 (flaccid catshark)
      - Apristurus fedorovi Dolganov, 1985 (Fedorov's catshark)
      - Apristurus garricki K. Sato, A. L. Stewart & Nakaya, 2013 (Garrick's catshark)
      - Apristurus gibbosus Q. W. Meng, Y. T. Chu & S. Li, 1985 (humpback catshark)
      - Apristurus herklotsi (Fowler, 1934) (long-fin catshark)
      - Apristurus indicus (A. B. Brauer, 1906) (small-belly catshark)
      - Apristurus internatus S. M. Deng, G. Q. Xiong & H. X. Zhan, 1988 (short-nose demon catshark)
      - Apristurus investigatoris (Misra, 1962) (broad-nose catshark)
      - Apristurus japonicus Nakaya, 1975 (Japanese catshark)
      - Apristurus kampae L. R. Taylor, 1972 (long-nose catshark)
      - Apristurus laurussonii (Sæmundsson, 1922) (Iceland catshark)
      - Apristurus longicephalus Nakaya, 1975 (long-head catshark)
      - Apristurus macrorhynchus (S. Tanaka (I), 1909) (flat-head catshark)
      - Apristurus macrostomus Q. W. Meng, Y. T. Chu & S. Li, 1985 (broad-mouth catshark)
      - Apristurus manis (S. Springer, 1979) (Ghost catshark)
      - Apristurus manocheriani Cordova, 2021 (Manocherian's catshark)
      - Apristurus melanoasper Iglésias, Nakaya & Stehmann, 2004 (black rough-scale catshark)
      - Apristurus microps (Gilchrist, 1922) (small-eye catshark)
      - Apristurus micropterygeus Q. W. Meng, Y. T. Chu & S. Li, 1986 (small-dorsal catshark)
      - Apristurus nakayai Iglésias, 2013 (milk-eye catshark)
      - Apristurus nasutus F. de Buen, 1959 (large-nose catshark)
      - Apristurus ovicorrugatus White, O'Neill, Devloo-Delva, Nakaya & Iglésias, 2023 (ridge-egg catshark)
      - Apristurus parvipinnis S. Springer & Heemstra, 1979 (small-fin catshark)
      - Apristurus pinguis S. M. Deng, G. Q. Xiong & H. X. Zhan, 1983 (fat catshark)
      - Apristurus platyrhynchus (S. Tanaka (I), 1909) (Borneo catshark)
      - Apristurus profundorum (Goode & T. H. Bean, 1896) (deep-water catshark)
      - Apristurus riveri Bigelow & Schroeder, 1944 (broad-gill catshark)
      - Apristurus saldanha (Barnard, 1925) (Saldanha catshark)
      - Apristurus sibogae (M. C. W. Weber, 1913) (pale catshark)
      - Apristurus sinensis Y. T. Chu & A. S. Hu, 1981 (South China catshark)
      - Apristurus spongiceps (C. H. Gilbert, 1905) (sponge-head catshark)
      - Apristurus stenseni (S. Springer, 1979) (Panama ghost catshark)
      - Apristurus yangi White, 2017 (Yang's longnose catshark)
      - Apristurus sp. X Not yet described (Galbraith's catshark)
      - Apristurus sp. 3 Not yet described (Black wonder catshark)
    - Genus Asymbolus Whitley, 1939
      - Asymbolus analis (J. D. Ogilby, 1885) (Australian spotted catshark)
      - Asymbolus funebris L. J. V. Compagno, J. D. Stevens & Last, 1999 (blotched catshark)
      - Asymbolus galacticus Séret & Last, 2008 (starry catshark)
      - Asymbolus occiduus Last, M. F. Gomon & Gledhill, 1999 (western spotted catshark)
      - Asymbolus pallidus Last, M. F. Gomon & Gledhill, 1999 (pale-spotted catshark)
      - Asymbolus parvus L. J. V. Compagno, Stevens & Last, 1999 (dwarf catshark)
      - Asymbolus rubiginosus Last, M. F. Gomon & Gledhill, 1999 (orange-spotted catshark)
      - Asymbolus submaculatus L. J. V. Compagno, J. D. Stevens & Last, 1999 (variegated catshark)
      - Asymbolus vincenti (Zietz (fi), 1908) (Gulf catshark)
    - Genus Bythaelurus L. J. V. Compagno, 1988
      - Bythaelurus alcockii (Garman, 1913) (Arabian catshark)
      - Bythaelurus bachi Weigman, 2016 (Bach's catshark)
      - Bythaelurus canescens (Günther, 1878) (dusky catshark)
      - Bythaelurus clevai (Séret, 1987) (broad-head catshark)
      - Bythaelurus dawsoni (S. Springer, 1971) (New Zealand catshark)
      - Bythaelurus giddingsi J. E. McCosker, Long & C. C. Baldwin, 2012 (jaguar catshark)
      - Bythaelurus hispidus (Alcock, 1891) (bristly catshark)
      - Bythaelurus immaculatus (Y. T. Chu & Q. W. Meng, 1982) (spotless catshark)
      - Bythaelurus incanus Last & J. D. Stevens, 2008 (sombre catshark)
      - Bythaelurus lutarius (S. Springer & D'Aubrey, 1972) (mud catshark)
      - Bythaelurus naylori Ebert & Clerkin, 2015 (dusky-snout catshark)
      - Bythaelurus tenuicephalus Kaschner, Weigmann & Thiel, 2015 (narrow-head catshark)
      - Bythaelurus stewarti Kaschner, Weigmann & Thiel, 2018 (Error Seamount catshark)
      - Bythaelurus vivaldii Kaschner & Weigmann, 2017 (Vivaldi's catshark)
    - Genus Cephalurus Bigelow & Schroeder, 1941
      - Cephalurus cephalus (C. H. Gilbert, 1892) (lollipop catshark)
      - Cephalurus sp. A Not yet described (southern lollipop catshark)
    - Genus Figaro Whitley, 1928
      - Figaro boardmani (Whitley, 1928) (Australian saw-tail catshark)
      - Figaro striatus Gledhill, Last & W. T. White, 2008 (northern saw-tail catshark)
    - Genus Galeus G. Cuvier, 1816
      - Galeus antillensis S. Springer, 1979 (Antilles catshark)
      - Galeus arae (Nichols, 1927) (rough-tail catshark)
      - Galeus atlanticus (Vaillant, 1888) (Atlantic saw-tail catshark)
      - Galeus cadenati S. Springer, 1966 (long-fin saw-tail catshark)
      - Galeus corriganae White, 2016
      - Galeus eastmani (D. S. Jordan & Snyder, 1904) (gecko catshark)
      - Galeus friedrichi Ebert & Jang, 2022 (Philippines sawtail catshark)
      - Galeus gracilis L. J. V. Compagno & J. D. Stevens, 1993 (slender saw-tail catshark)
      - Galeus longirostris Tachikawa & Taniuchi, 1987 (long-nose saw-tail catshark)
      - Galeus melastomus Rafinesque, 1810 (black-mouth catshark)
      - Galeus mincaronei Soto, 2001 (southern saw-tail catshark)
      - Galeus murinus (Collett, 1904) (mouse catshark)
      - Galeus nipponensis Nakaya, 1975 (broad-fin saw-tail catshark)
      - Galeus piperatus S. Springer & M. H. Wagner, 1966 (peppered catshark)
      - Galeus polli Cadenat, 1959 (African saw-tail catshark)
      - Galeus priapus Séret & Last, 2008 (phallic catshark)
      - Galeus sauteri (D. S. Jordan & R. E. Richardson, 1909) (black-tip saw-tail catshark)
      - Galeus schultzi S. Springer, 1979 (dwarf saw-tail catshark)
      - Galeus springeri Konstantinou & Cozzi, 1998 (Springer's saw-tail catshark)
    - Genus Halaelurus T. N. Gill, 1862
      - Halaelurus boesemani |S. Springer & D'Aubrey, 1972 (speckled catshark)
      - Halaelurus buergeri (J. P. Müller & Henle, 1838) (black-spotted catshark)
      - Halaelurus lineatus Bass, D'Aubrey & Kistnasamy, 1975 (lined catshark)
      - Halaelurus maculosus W. T. White, Last & J. D. Stevens, 2007 (Indonesian speckled catshark)
      - Halaelurus natalensis (Regan, 1904) (tiger catshark)
      - Halaelurus quagga (Alcock, 1899) (quagga catshark)
      - Halaelurus sellus W. T. White, Last & J. D. Stevens, 2007 (rusty catshark)
    - Genus Haploblepharus Garman, 1913
      - Haploblepharus edwardsii (Schinz, 1822) (puff adder shyshark)
      - Haploblepharus fuscus J. L. B. Smith, 1950 (brown shyshark)
      - Haploblepharus kistnasamyi Human &L. J. V. Compagno, 2006 (natal shyshark)
      - Haploblepharus pictus (J. P. Müller & Henle, 1838) (dark shyshark)
    - Genus Holohalaelurus Fowler, 1934
      - Holohalaelurus favus Human, 2006 (honeycomb catshark)
      - Holohalaelurus grennian Human, 2006 (grinning catshark)
      - Holohalaelurus melanostigma (Norman, 1939) (crying catshark)
      - Holohalaelurus punctatus (Gilchrist, 1914) (white-spotted catshark)
      - Holohalaelurus regani (Gilchrist, 1922) (Izak catshark)
    - Genus Parmaturus Garman, 1906
      - Parmaturus albipenis Séret & Last, 2007 (white-clasper catshark)
      - Parmaturus angelae Soares, 2019 (Brazilian file-tail catshark)
      - Parmaturus campechiensis S. Springer, 1979 (Campeche catshark)
      - Parmaturus lanatus Séret & Last, 2007 (velvet catshark)
      - Parmaturus macmillani Hardy, 1985 (McMillan's catshark)
      - Parmaturus pilosus Garman, 1906 (salamander catshark)
      - Parmaturus xaniurus (C. H. Gilbert, 1892) (file-tail catshark)
      - Parmaturus sp. Not yet described (rough-back catshark)
      - Parmaturus sp. Not yet described (Gulf of Mexico file-tail catshark)
    - Genus Pentanchus H. M. Smith & Radcliffe, 1912
      - Pentanchus profundicolus H. M. Smith & Radcliffe, 1912 (one-fin catshark)
  - Family Proscylliidae (fin-back catsharks)
    - Genus Ctenacis L. J. V. Compagno, 1973
      - Ctenacis fehlmanni (S. Springer, 1968) (harlequin catshark)
    - Genus Eridacnis H. M. Smith, 1913
      - Eridacnis barbouri (Bigelow & Schroeder, 1944) (Cuban ribbontail catshark)
      - Eridacnis radcliffei H. M. Smith, 1913 (pygmy ribbontail catshark)
      - Eridacnis sinuans (J. L. B. Smith, 1957) (African ribbontail catshark)
      - Eridacnis sp. 1 Not yet described (Philippines ribbontail catshark)
    - Genus Proscyllium Hilgendorf, 1904
      - Proscyllium habereri Hilgendorf, 1904 (graceful catshark)
      - Proscyllium magnificum Last & Vongpanich, 2004 (magnificent catshark)
  - Family Pseudotriakidae (False catsharks)
    - Genus Gollum L. J. V. Compagno, 1973
      - Gollum attenuatus (Garrick, 1954) (slender smooth-hound)
      - Gollum suluensis Last & Gaudiano, 2011 (Sulu gollumshark)
      - Gollum sp. B Not yet described (white-marked gollumshark)
    - Genus Planonasus Weigmann, Stehmann & Thiel, 2013
      - Planonasus parini Weigmann, Stehmann & Thiel, 2013 (dwarf false catshark)
      - Planonasus indicus Ebert, 2018
    - Genus Pseudotriakis Brito Capello, 1868
      - Pseudotriakis microdon Brito Capello, 1868 (false catshark)
  - Family Scyliorhinidae (catsharks)
    - Genus Akheilos
      - Akheilos suwartanai White, 2019
    - Genus Atelomycterus Garman, 1913
      - Atelomycterus baliensis W. T. White, Last & Dharmadi, 2005 (Bali catshark)
      - Atelomycterus erdmanni Fahmi & W. T. White, 2015 (spotted-belly catshark)
      - Atelomycterus fasciatus L. J. V. Compagno & J. D. Stevens, 1993 (banded sand catshark)
      - Atelomycterus macleayi Whitley, 1939 (Australian marbled catshark)
      - Atelomycterus marmoratus (Anonymous, referred to E. T. Bennett, 1830) (coral catshark)
      - Atelomycterus marnkalha Jacobsen & M. B. Bennett, 2007 (eastern banded catshark)
    - Genus Aulohalaelurus Fowler, 1934
      - Aulohalaelurus kanakorum Séret, 1990 (Kanakorum catshark)
      - Aulohalaelurus labiosus (Waite, 1905) (Australian black-spotted catshark)
    - Genus Cephaloscyllium T. N. Gill, 1862
      - Cephaloscyllium albipinnum Last, Motomura & W. T. White, 2008 (white-fin swellshark)
      - Cephaloscyllium cooki Last, Séret & W. T. White, 2008 (Cook's swellshark)
      - Cephaloscyllium fasciatum W. L. Y. Chan, 1966 (reticulated swellshark)
      - Cephaloscyllium formosanum Teng, 1962 (Formosa swellshark)
      - Cephaloscyllium hiscosellum W. T. White & Ebert, 2008 (Australian reticulated swellshark)
      - Cephaloscyllium isabellum (Bonnaterre, 1788) (draughtsboard shark)
      - Cephaloscyllium laticeps (A. H. A. Duméril, 1853) (Australian swellshark)
      - Cephaloscyllium pictum Last, Séret & W. T. White, 2008 (painted swellshark)
      - Cephaloscyllium sarawakensis Ka. Yano, A. Ahmad & Gambang, 2005 (Sarawak pygmy swellshark)
      - Cephaloscyllium signourum Last, Séret & W. T. White, 2008 (flag-tail swellshark)
      - Cephaloscyllium silasi (Talwar, 1974) (Indian swellshark)
      - Cephaloscyllium speccum Last, Séret & W. T. White, 2008 (speckled swellshark)
      - Cephaloscyllium stevensi E. Clark & J. E. Randall, 2011 (Steven's swellshark)
      - Cephaloscyllium sufflans (Regan, 1921) (balloon shark)
      - Cephaloscyllium umbratile D. S. Jordan & Fowler, 1903 (blotchy swellshark)
      - Cephaloscyllium variegatum Last & W. T. White, 2008 (saddled swellshark)
      - Cephaloscyllium ventriosum (Garman, 1880) (swellshark)
      - Cephaloscyllium zebrum Last & W. T. White, 2008 (narrow-bar swellshark)
      - Cephaloscyllium sp. 1 Not yet described (Philippines swellshark)
    - Genus Poroderma A. Smith, 1838
      - Poroderma africanum (J. F. Gmelin, 1789) (Striped catshark)
      - Poroderma pantherinum (J. P. Müller & Henle, 1838) (leopard catshark)
    - Genus Schroederichthys A. Smith, 1838
      - Schroederichthys bivius (J. P. Müller & Henle, 1838) (narrow-mouthed catshark)
      - Schroederichthys chilensis (Guichenot, 1848) (red-spotted catshark)
      - Schroederichthys maculatus S. Springer, 1966 (narrow-tail catshark)
      - Schroederichthys saurisqualus Soto, 2001 (lizard catshark)
      - Schroederichthys tenuis S. Springer, 1966 (slender catshark)
    - Genus Scyliorhinus Blainville, 1816
      - Scyliorhinus boa Goode & T. H. Bean, 1896 (boa catshark)
      - Scyliorhinus cabofriensis K. D. A. Soares, U. L. Gomes & M. R. de Carvalho, 2016
      - Scyliorhinus canicula (Linnaeus, 1758) (small-spotted catshark)
      - Scyliorhinus capensis (J. P. Müller & Henle, 1838) (yellow-spotted catshark)
      - Scyliorhinus cervigoni Maurin & M. Bonnet, 1970 (West African catshark)
      - Scyliorhinus comoroensis L. J. V. Compagno, 1988 (Comoro catshark)
      - Scyliorhinus garmani (Fowler, 1934) (brown-spotted catshark)
      - Scyliorhinus hachijoensis Ito, Fuji, Nohara, and Tanaka, 2022 (cinder cloudy catshark)
      - Scyliorhinus haeckelii (A. Miranda-Ribeiro, 1907) (freckled catshark)
      - Scyliorhinus hesperius S. Springer, 1966 (white-saddled catshark)
      - Scyliorhinus meadi S. Springer, 1966 (blotched catshark)
      - Scyliorhinus retifer (Garman, 1881) (chain catshark)
      - Scyliorhinus stellaris (Linnaeus, 1758) (nursehound)
      - Scyliorhinus tokubee Shirai, S. Hagiwara & Nakaya, 1992 (Izu catshark)
      - Scyliorhinus torazame (S. Tanaka (I), 1908) (cloudy catshark)
      - Scyliorhinus torrei Howell-Rivero, 1936 (dwarf catshark)
      - Scyliorhinus ugoi K. D. A. Soares, Gadig & U. L. Gomes, 2015 (dark-freckled catshark)
      - Scyliorhinus sp. X Not yet described (Oakley's catshark)
  - Family Sphyrnidae (hammerhead sharks)
    - Genus Eusphyra T. N. Gill, 1862
      - Eusphyra blochii (G. Cuvier, 1816) (wing-head shark)
    - Genus Sphyrna Rafinesque, 1810
      - Sphyrna alleni Gonzalez, Postaire, Driggers, Caballero, & Chapman, 2024 (shovelbill shark)
      - Sphyrna corona S. Springer, 1940 (scalloped bonnethead)
      - Sphyrna gilberti Quattro, Driggers, Grady, Ulrich & M. A. Roberts, 2013 (Carolina hammerhead)
      - Sphyrna lewini (E. Griffith & C. H. Smith, 1834) (scalloped hammerhead)
      - Sphyrna media S. Springer, 1940 (scoop-head hammerhead)
      - Sphyrna mokarran (Rüppell, 1837) (great hammerhead)
      - Sphyrna tiburo (Linnaeus, 1758) (bonnethead shark)
      - Sphyrna tudes (Valenciennes, 1822) (small-eye hammerhead)
      - Sphyrna zygaena (Linnaeus, 1758) (smooth hammerhead)
  - Family Triakidae (Houndsharks)
    - Genus Furgaleus Whitley, 1951
      - Furgaleus macki (Whitley, 1943) (whiskery shark)
    - Genus Galeorhinus Blainville, 1816
      - Galeorhinus galeus (Linnaeus, 1758) (tope shark)
    - Genus Gogolia L. J. V. Compagno, 1973
      - Gogolia filewoodi L. J. V. Compagno, 1973 (sail-back houndshark)
    - Genus Hemitriakis Herre, 1923
      - Hemitriakis abdita L. J. V. Compagno & J. D. Stevens, 1993 (deep-water sickle-fin houndshark)
      - Hemitriakis complicofasciata T. Takahashi & Nakaya, 2004 (ocellated topeshark)
      - Hemitriakis falcata L. J. V. Compagno & J. D. Stevens, 1993 (sickle-fin houndshark)
      - Hemitriakis indroyonoi W. T. White, L. J. V. Compagno & Dharmadi, 2009 (Indonesian houndshark)
      - Hemitriakis japanica (J. P. Müller & Henle, 1839) (Japanese topeshark)
      - Hemitriakis leucoperiptera Herre, 1923 (white-fin topeshark)
    - Genus Hypogaleus J. L. B. Smith, 1957
      - Hypogaleus hyugaensis (Miyosi, 1939) (black-tip tope)
    - Genus Iago L. J. V. Compagno & S. Springer, 1971
      - Iago garricki Fourmanoir & Rivaton, 1979 (long-nose houndshark)
      - Iago omanensis (Norman, 1939) (big-eye houndshark)
    - Genus Mustelus H. F. Linck, 1790
      - Mustelus andamanensis

White, 2021 (Andaman smooth-mouth)

      - Mustelus albipinnis Castro-Aguirre, Antuna-Mendiola, González-Acosta & De La Cruz-Agüero, 2005 (white-margin fin houndshark)
      - Mustelus antarcticus Günther, 1870 (gummy shark)
      - Mustelus asterias Cloquet, 1821 (starry smooth-hound)
      - Mustelus californicus T. N. Gill, 1864 (grey smooth-hound)
      - Mustelus canis (Mitchill, 1815)
        - M. c. canis (Mitchill, 1815) (dusky smooth-hound)
        - M. c. insularis Heemstra, 1997 (Caribbean smooth-hound)
      - Mustelus dorsalis T. N. Gill, 1864 (sharp-tooth smooth-hound)
      - Mustelus fasciatus (Garman, 1913) (Striped smooth-hound)
      - Mustelus griseus Pietschmann, 1908 (spotless smooth-hound)
      - Mustelus henlei (T. N. Gill, 1863) (brown smooth-hound)
      - Mustelus higmani S. Springer & R. H. Lowe, 1963 (small-eye smooth-hound)
      - Mustelus lenticulatus Phillipps, 1932 (spotted estuary smooth-hound)
      - Mustelus lunulatus D. S. Jordan & C. H. Gilbert, 1882 (sickle-fin smooth-hound)
      - Mustelus manazo Bleeker, 1854 (star-spotted smooth-hound)
      - Mustelus mangalorensis Cubelio, Remya R & Kurup, 2011 (Mangalore houndshark)
      - Mustelus mento Cope, 1877 (speckled smooth-hound)
      - Mustelus minicanis Heemstra, 1997 (Dwarf smooth-hound)
      - Mustelus mosis Hemprich & Ehrenberg, 1899 (Arabian smooth-hound)
      - Mustelus mustelus (Linnaeus, 1758) (common smooth-hound)
      - Mustelus norrisi S. Springer, 1939 (narrow-fin smooth-hound)
      - Mustelus palumbes J. L. B. Smith, 1957 (white-spotted smooth-hound)
      - Mustelus punctulatus A. Risso, 1827 (black-spotted smooth-hound)
      - Mustelus ravidus W. T. White & Last, 2006 (Australian grey smooth-hound)
      - Mustelus schmitti S. Springer, 1939 (narrow-nose smooth-hound)
      - Mustelus sinusmexicanus Heemstra, 1997 (Gulf smooth-hound)
      - Mustelus stevensi W. T. White & Last, 2008 (western spotted gummy shark)
      - Mustelus walkeri W. T. White & Last, 2008 (eastern spotted gummy shark)
      - Mustelus whitneyi Chirichigno F., 1973 (humpback smooth-hound)
      - Mustelus widodoi W. T. White & Last, 2006 (white-fin smooth-hound)
      - Mustelus sp. Not yet described (Sarawak smooth-hound)
      - Mustelus sp. Not yet described (Kermadec smooth-hound)
    - Genus Scylliogaleus Boulenger, 1902
      - Scylliogaleus quecketti Boulenger, 1902 (flap-nose houndshark)
    - Genus Triakis J. P. Müller & Henle, 1838
      - Triakis acutipinna Kato, 1968 (sharp-fin houndshark)
      - Triakis maculata Kner & Steindachner, 1867 (spotted houndshark)
      - Triakis megalopterus (A. Smith, 1839) (sharp-tooth houndshark)
      - Triakis scyllium J. P. Müller & Henle, 1839 (banded houndshark)
      - Triakis semifasciata Girard, 1855 (leopard shark)

== Alphabetic sort ==
- A
  - African angelshark
  - African dwarf sawshark
  - African lanternshark
  - African ribbontail catshark
  - African sawtail catshark
  - American pocket shark
  - Angelshark
  - Angular angelshark
  - Angular roughshark
  - Antilles catshark
  - Arabian carpetshark
  - Arabian catshark
  - Arabian smooth-hound
  - Argentine angelshark
  - Arrowhead dogfish
  - Atlantic angel shark
  - Atlantic sawtail catshark
  - Atlantic sharpnose shark
  - Atlantic sixgill shark
  - Atlantic weasel shark
  - Australian angelshark
  - Australian blackspotted catshark
  - Australian blacktip shark
  - Australian blotched catshark
  - Australian grey smooth-hound
  - Australian marbled catshark
  - Australian reticulate swellshark
  - Australian sawtail catshark
  - Australian sharpnose shark
  - Australian spotted catshark
  - Australian swellshark
  - Australian weasel shark
  - Azores dogfish
- B
  - Bahamas sawshark
  - Bali catshark
  - Balloon shark
  - Banded houndshark
  - Banded sand catshark
  - Banded wobbegong
  - Bartail spurdog
  - Barbelthroat carpetshark
  - Barbeled houndshark
  - Bareskin dogfish
  - Basking shark
  - Beige catshark
  - Bigeye houndshark
  - Bigeye sand tiger
  - Bigeye thresher shark
  - Bighead catshark
  - Bighead spurdog
  - Bignose shark
  - Bigeyed sixgill shark
  - Birdbeak dogfish
  - Blackbelly lanternshark
  - Black dogfish
  - Blackfin gulper shark
  - Blackgill catshark
  - Blackmouth catshark
  - Blackmouth lanternshark
  - Blacknose shark
  - Black roughscale catshark
  - Blackspot shark
  - Blackspotted catshark
  - Blackspotted smooth-hound
  - Blacktail reef shark
  - Blacktailed spurdog
  - Blacktip reef shark
  - Blacktip sawtail catshark
  - Blacktip shark
  - Blacktip tope
  - Black wonder catshark
  - Blind shark
  - Blotched catshark
  - Blotchy swellshark
  - Blue-eye lanternshark
  - Bluegrey carpetshark
  - Blue shark
  - Bluntnose sixgill shark
  - Blunt-nose spiny dogfish
  - Blurred lanternshark
  - Boa catshark
  - Bonnethead shark
  - Borneo broadfin shark
  - Borneo shark
  - Bramble shark
  - Brazilian sharpnose shark
  - Bristled lanternshark
  - Bristly catshark
  - Broadbanded lanternshark
  - Broadfin sawtail catshark
  - Broadfin shark
  - Broadgill catshark
  - Broadhead catshark
  - Broadmouth catshark
  - Broadnose catshark
  - Broadnose sevengill shark
  - Broad-snout lanternshark
  - Brownbanded bamboo shark
  - Brown catshark
  - Brown lanternshark
  - Brown shyshark
  - Brown smoothhound
  - Brownspotted catshark
  - Bull shark
  - Burmese bamboo shark
- C
  - Campeche catshark
  - Caribbean lanternshark
  - Caribbean reef shark
  - Caribbean roughshark
  - Caribbean sharpnose shark
  - Caribbean smooth-hound
  - Carolina hammerhead
  - Cenderawasih epaulette shark
  - Chain catshark
  - Chilean angelshark
  - Chilean lanternshark
  - Clouded angelshark
  - Cloudy catshark
  - Coates' shark
  - Cobbler wobbegong
  - Collared carpetshark
  - Combtooth dogfish
  - Combtooth lanternshark
  - Common smooth-hound
  - Comoro catshark
  - Cook's swellshark
  - Cookiecutter shark
  - Copper shark
  - Coral catshark
  - Creek whaler
  - Crested bullhead shark
  - Crocodile shark
  - Crying catshark
  - Cuban dogfish
  - Cuban ribbontail catshark
  - Cylindrical lanternshark
  - Cyrano spurdog
- D
  - Daggernose shark
  - Dark freckled catshark
  - Dark shyshark
  - Deepwater catshark
  - Deepwater sicklefin houndshark
  - Dense-scale lantern shark
  - Disparate angelshark
  - Draughtsboard shark
  - Dudgeon's walking shark
  - Dumb gulper shark
  - Dusky catshark
  - Dusky shark
  - Dusky smooth-hound
  - Dusky snout catshark
  - Dwarf catshark
  - Dwarf false catshark
  - Dwarf gulper shark
  - Dwarf lanternshark
  - Dwarf sawtail catshark
  - Dwarf smooth-hound
  - Dwarf spotted wobbegong
- E
  - Eastern angelshark
  - Eastern banded catshark
  - Eastern highfin spurdog
  - Eastern longnose spurdog
  - Eastern spotted gummy shark
  - Edmund's spurdog
  - Elongate carpetshark
  - Epaulette shark
- F
  - False catshark
  - False lanternshark
  - False smalltail shark
  - Fat catshark
  - Fatspine spurdog
  - Fedorov's catshark
  - Filetail catshark
  - Finetooth shark
  - Flaccid catshark
  - Flagtail swellshark
  - Flapnose houndshark
  - Flathead catshark
  - Floral banded wobbegong
  - Formosa swellshark
  - Freckled catshark
  - Frilled shark
  - Fringefin lanternshark
  - Frog shark
- G
  - Galapagos bullhead shark
  - Galapagos shark
  - Galbraith's catshark
  - Ganges shark
  - Garrick's catshark
  - Gecko catshark
  - Genie's dogfish
  - Ghost catshark
  - Ginger carpetshark
  - Goblin shark
  - Graceful catshark
  - Graceful shark
  - Granular dogfish
  - Great hammerhead
  - Great lanternshark
  - Great white shark
  - Green-eye spurdog
  - Green lanternshark
  - Greenland shark
  - Grey bamboo shark
  - Grey sharpnose shark
  - Grey smooth-hound
  - Grinning catshark
  - Guadalupe lanternshark
  - Gulf catshark
  - Gulf of Mexico filetail catshark
  - Gulf smooth-hound
  - Gulper shark
  - Gummy shark
- H
  - Halmahera epaulette shark
  - Hardnose shark
  - Harlequin catshark
  - Hasselt's bamboo shark
  - Hawaiian lanternshark
  - Hidden angelshark
  - Highfin dogfish
  - Hoary catshark
  - Honeycomb Izak
  - Hooded carpetshark
  - Hooktooth dogfish
  - Hooktooth shark
  - Horn shark
  - Human's whaler shark
  - Humpback catshark
  - Humpback smooth-hound
- I
  - Iceland catshark
  - Indian swellshark
  - Indonesian angelshark
  - Indonesian filetail catshark
  - Indonesian greeneye spurdog
  - Indonesian houndshark
  - Indonesian shortsnout spurdog
  - Indonesian speckled carpetshark
  - Indonesian speckled catshark
  - Indonesian whaler shark
  - Indonesian wobbegong
  - Izak catshark
  - Izu catshark
- J
  - Jaguar catshark
  - Japanese angelshark
  - Japanese bullhead shark
  - Japanese catshark
  - Japanese roughshark
  - Japanese sawshark
  - Japanese shortnose spurdog
  - Japanese spurdog
  - Japanese topeshark
  - Japanese velvet dogfish
  - Japanese wobbegong
- K
  - Kermadec smooth hound
  - Kermadec spiny dogfish
  - Kitefin shark
  - Knifetooth dogfish
- L
  - Lana's sawshark
  - Largenose catshark
  - Largespine velvet dogfish
  - Largetooth cookiecutter shark
  - Leafscale gulper shark
  - Lemon shark
  - Leopard catshark
  - Leopard epaulette shark
  - Leopard shark
  - Lined catshark
  - Lined lanternshark
  - Little gulper shark
  - Little sleeper shark
  - Lizard catshark
  - Lollipop catshark
  - Lombok highfin spurdog
  - Longfin catshark
  - Longfin mako
  - Longfin sawtail catshark
  - Longhead catshark
  - Longnose catshark
  - Longnose houndshark
  - Longnose pygmy shark
  - Longnose sawshark
  - Longnose sawtail catshark
  - Longnose sleeper shark
  - Longnose spurdog
  - Longnose velvet dogfish
  - Longsnout dogfish
  - Lost shark
  - Lowfin gulper shark
- M
  - Magnificent catshark
  - Mandarin dogfish
  - Mangalore houndshark
  - McMillan's catshark
  - Megalodon
  - Megamouth shark
  - Mexican angelshark
  - Mexican hornshark
  - Milk-eye catshark
  - Milk shark
  - Mini gulper shark
  - Moller's lanternshark
  - Mosaic gulper shark
  - Mouse catshark
  - Mud catshark
  - Mukah river shark
- N
  - Narrowbar swellshark
  - Narrowfin smooth-hound
  - Narrowhead catshark
  - Narrowmouthed catshark
  - Narrownose smooth-hound
  - Narrowtail catshark
  - Natal shyshark
  - Necklace carpetshark
  - Nervous shark
  - Network wobbegong
  - New Caledonia catshark
  - New Zealand catshark
  - New Zealand lanternshark
  - Night shark
  - Ninja lanternshark
  - Northern river shark
  - Northern sawtail catshark
  - Northern spiny dogfish
  - Northern wobbegong
  - Nurse shark
  - Nursehound
- O
  - Oakley's catshark
  - Oceanic whitetip shark
  - Ocellate topeshark
  - Ocellated angelshark
  - Oman bullhead shark
  - Onefin catshark
  - Orange spotted catshark
  - Ornate angelshark
  - Ornate dogfish
  - Ornate wobbegong
- P
  - Pacific angelshark
  - Pacific nurse shark
  - Pacific sharpnose shark
  - Pacific sleeper shark
  - Pacific smalltail shark
  - Pacific spadenose shark
  - Pacific spiny dogfish
  - Painted swellshark
  - Pale catshark
  - Pale spotted catshark
  - Panama ghost catshark
  - Papua shorttail lanternshark
  - Papuan epaulette shark
  - Pelagic thresher shark
  - Peppered catshark
  - Phallic catshark
  - Philippines angelshark
  - Philippines ribbontail catshark
  - Philippines swellshark
  - Pigeye shark
  - Pink lanternshark
  - Pinocchio catshark
  - Plunket's shark
  - Pocket shark
  - Pondicherry shark
  - Porbeagle shark
  - Port Jackson shark
  - Portuguese dogfish
  - Prickly dogfish
  - Prickly shark
  - Puffadder shyshark
  - Pygmy lanternshark
  - Pygmy ribbontail catshark
  - Pygmy shark
- Q
  - Quagga catshark
- R
  - Rasptooth dogfish
  - Redspotted catshark
  - Reticulated swellshark
  - Roughback catshark
  - Ridged-egg catshark
  - Rough longnose dogfish
  - Roughback bristle shark
  - Roughskin catshark
  - Roughskin dogfish
  - Roughskin spurdog
  - Roughtail catshark
  - Rusty carpetshark
  - Rusty catshark
- S
  - Saddle carpetshark
  - Saddled swellshark
  - Sailback houndshark
  - Sailfin roughshark
  - Salamander shark
  - Saldanha catshark
  - Salmon shark
  - Sandtiger shark
  - Sandbar shark
  - Sarawak pygmy swellshark
  - Sarawak smooth-hound
  - Sawback angelshark
  - Scalloped bonnethead
  - Scalloped hammerhead
  - Scoophead
  - Sculpted lanternshark
  - Seychelles carpetshark
  - Seychelles gulper shark
  - Seychelles spurdog
  - Sharpfin houndshark
  - Sharpnose sevengill shark
  - Sharptooth houndshark
  - Sharptooth smooth-hound
  - Sherwood dogfish
  - Shortbelly catshark
  - Shortfin mako
  - Shortfin smooth lanternshark
  - Shortnose demon catshark
  - Shortnose sawshark
  - Shortnose spurdog
  - Shortspine spurdog
  - Shorttail lanternshark
  - Shorttail nurse shark
  - Sicklefin houndshark
  - Sicklefin lemon shark
  - Sicklefin smooth-hound
  - Sicklefin weasel shark
  - Silky shark
  - Silvertip shark
  - Sixgill sawshark
  - Slender bamboo shark
  - Slender catshark
  - Slender gulper shark
  - Slender sawtail catshark
  - Slender smooth-hound
  - Slender weasel shark
  - Sliteye shark
  - Smallbelly catshark
  - Smalldorsal catshark
  - Smalleye catshark
  - Smalleye hammerhead
  - Smalleye lantern shark
  - Smalleye pygmy shark
  - Smalleye smooth-hound
  - Smallfin catshark
  - Smallfin gulper shark
  - Small-spotted catshark
  - Smalltail shark
  - Smalltooth sand tiger
  - Smoothback angelshark
  - Smooth hammerhead
  - Smooth lanternshark
  - Smoothtooth blacktip shark
  - Snaggletooth shark
  - Sombre catshark
  - South China catshark
  - Southern African frilled shark
  - Southern dogfish
  - Southern lanternshark
  - Southern lollipop catshark
  - Southern mandarin dogfish
  - Southern sawtail catshark
  - Southern sleeper shark
  - Spadenose shark
  - Sparsetooth dogfish
  - Spatulasnout catshark
  - Speartooth shark
  - Speckled carpetshark
  - Speckled catshark
  - Speckled smooth-hound
  - Speckled swellshark
  - Spined pygmy shark
  - Spinner shark
  - Spiny dogfish
  - Splendid lanternshark
  - Spongehead catshark
  - Spotless catshark
  - Spotless smooth-hound
  - Spottail shark
  - Spotted-belly catshark
  - Spotted estuary smooth-hound
  - Spotted houndshark
  - Spotted wobbegong
  - Springer's sawtail catshark
  - Starspotted smooth-hound
  - Starry catshark
  - Starry smooth-hound
  - Steven's swellshark
  - Straight-tooth weasel shark
  - Striped catshark
  - Striped smooth-hound
  - Sulu gollumshark
  - Swellshark
- T
  - Taillight shark
  - Tailspot lanternshark
  - Taiwan angelshark
  - Taiwan saddled carpetshark
  - Taiwan spurdog
  - Tasselled wobbegong
  - Tawny nurse shark
  - Thorny lanternshark
  - Thresher shark
  - Tiger catshark
  - Tiger shark
  - Tope shark
  - Triton epaulette shark
  - Tropical sawshark
- V
  - Variegated catshark
  - Velvet belly lanternshark
  - Velvet catshark
  - Velvet dogfish
  - Viper dogfish
- W
  - West African catshark
  - West Indian lanternshark
  - Western angelshark
  - Western gulper shark
  - Western highfin spurdog
  - Western longnose spurdog
  - Western spotted catshark
  - Western spotted gummy shark
  - Western wobbegong
  - Whale shark
  - Whiskery shark
  - White-bodied catshark
  - Whitecheek shark
  - White-clasper catshark
  - Whitefin dogfish
  - White-fin smooth-hound
  - Whitefin swellshark
  - Whitefin topeshark
  - White ghost catshark
  - White-margin fin smooth-hound
  - Whitemarked gollumshark
  - Whitenose shark
  - Whitesaddled catshark
  - Whitespotted bamboo shark
  - Whitespotted bullhead shark
  - Whitespotted catshark
  - Whitespotted smooth-hound
  - Whitetail dogfish
  - White-tip catshark
  - Whitetip reef shark
  - Whitetip weasel shark
  - Winghead shark
- Y
  - Yellowspotted catshark
- Z
  - Zebra bullhead shark
  - Zebra shark

== See also ==
- List of Chimaeras
- List of prehistoric cartilaginous fish genera
- List of threatened sharks
- Outline of sharks
- List of sharks in California
