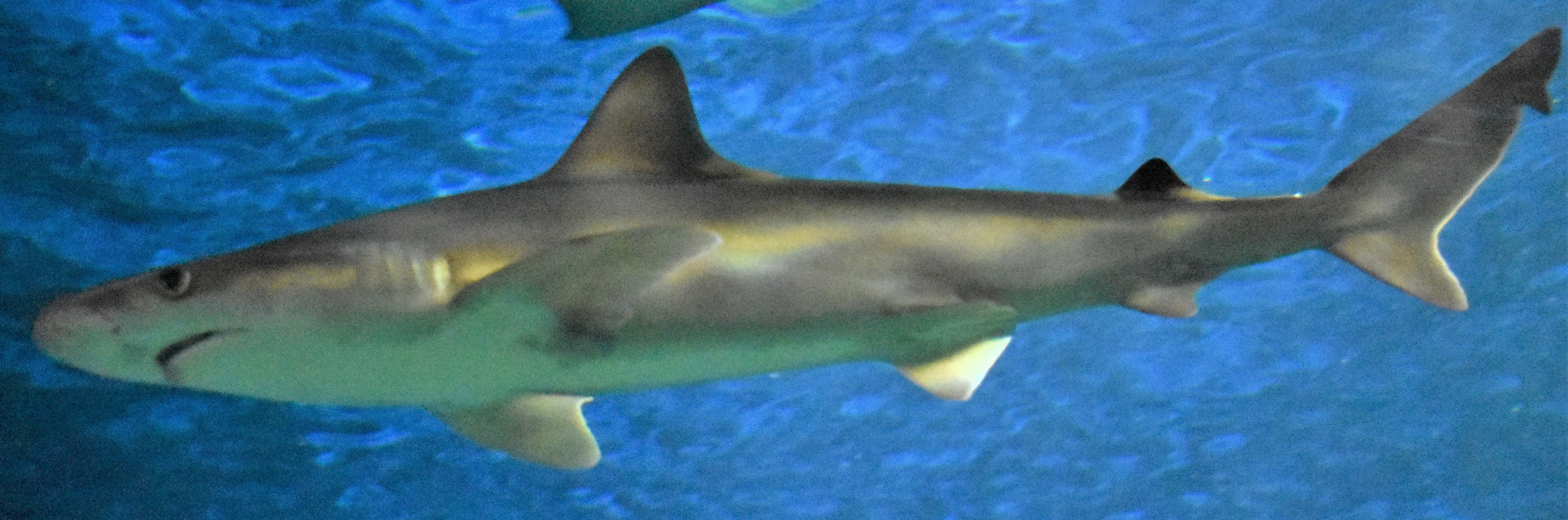

Conservation status
- Vulnerable (IUCN 3.1)

Scientific classification
- Kingdom: Animalia
- Phylum: Chordata
- Class: Chondrichthyes
- Subclass: Elasmobranchii
- Division: Selachii
- Order: Carcharhiniformes
- Family: Carcharhinidae
- Genus: Carcharhinus
- Species: C. tjutjot

Binomial name
- Carcharhinus tjutjot Bleeker, 1852

Synonyms
- Carcharias javanicus Bleeker, 1852; Carcharias tjutjot Bleeker, 1852

= Carcharhinus tjutjot =

Indonesian whaler shark

Species of shark

The Indonesian whaler shark (Carcharhinus tjutjot) is a species of requiem shark belonging to the family Carcharhinidae. Until recently, it was thought to be a junior synonym of the whitecheek shark (C. dussumieri). The Indonesian whaler shark, along with the family Carcharhinidae, is a key economic group in global fisheries including commercial and small-scale fisheries within the Indo-Pacific region. Common spawning and nursery areas overlap with commercial fishing grounds and it is often caught as bycatch which has caused it to be listed as a vulnerable species.

== Taxonomy ==
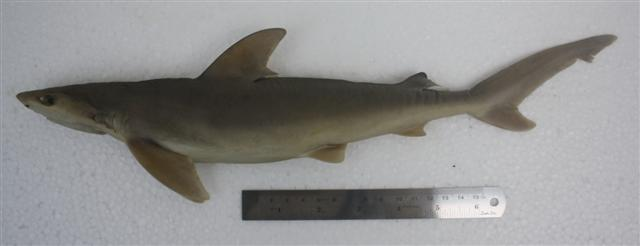
Carcharhinus sealei found in Malaysia, its similar markings on the second dorsal fin cause its morphological identification to overlap with C. tjutjot

Initially thought of as C. dussumieri, it was later identified as a distinct species in 2012 by morphological characteristics such as vertebral counts, dorsal and pectoral fin shape, and fin colouration. Now known as the Indonesian whaler shark, its divergence has characterized shark populations within the tropical Indo-West Pacific.

Morphological ambiguities and similarities to the blackspot shark (C. sealei) complicated the identification of C. tutjot across the Indo-West Pacific region. Distinctions arose in the genetic sampling of C. tutjot however, certain characteristics were hard to distinguish from C. sealei such as the black markings on the second dorsal fin.

== Description ==
The Indonesian whaler shark is often confused with C. sealei due to their similarities in morphologies. They can be identified by a black marking in the second dorsal fin, a relatively long snout, and an erect triangular first dorsal fin. Their upper anterior teeth are slanted, with jagged, knife-like cusplets flanking it. They range in size from 76 cm at first maturity to about 100 cm for males and 92 cm for females when fully mature. Size at birth is around 34–38 cm.

== Distribution ==
C. tjujot is a highly migratory species. Commonly found in the western Pacific, ranging from Indonesia and Taiwan to Borneo. They are not found in Australia or New Guinea and are not confirmed to live west of the Indo-Malay Peninsula. They prefer to live in depths ranging from the surface to 170 meters and in demersal inshore habitats.

Molecular genetic analysis have shown the presence of two distinct population groups in the eastern Indian Ocean. Studies suggest that C. tjujot has a restricted migration range in the Indian Ocean or the South China Sea.

== Status ==
The Indonesian whaler shark is listed as Vulnerable by the IUCN in its Red List of Threatened Species. Studies have shown that sharks landed on the Malaysian Peninsula and coast of Borneo Island are mainly juvenile, with size and maturity ranging from less than or at birth. Due to the overlap in nursery and common fishing grounds, the species is near facing threat from extinction. Small sharks are commonly caught as bycatch by long-range fisheries, sometimes without fins as they are marketable for human consumption.

== See also ==
- List of sharks
