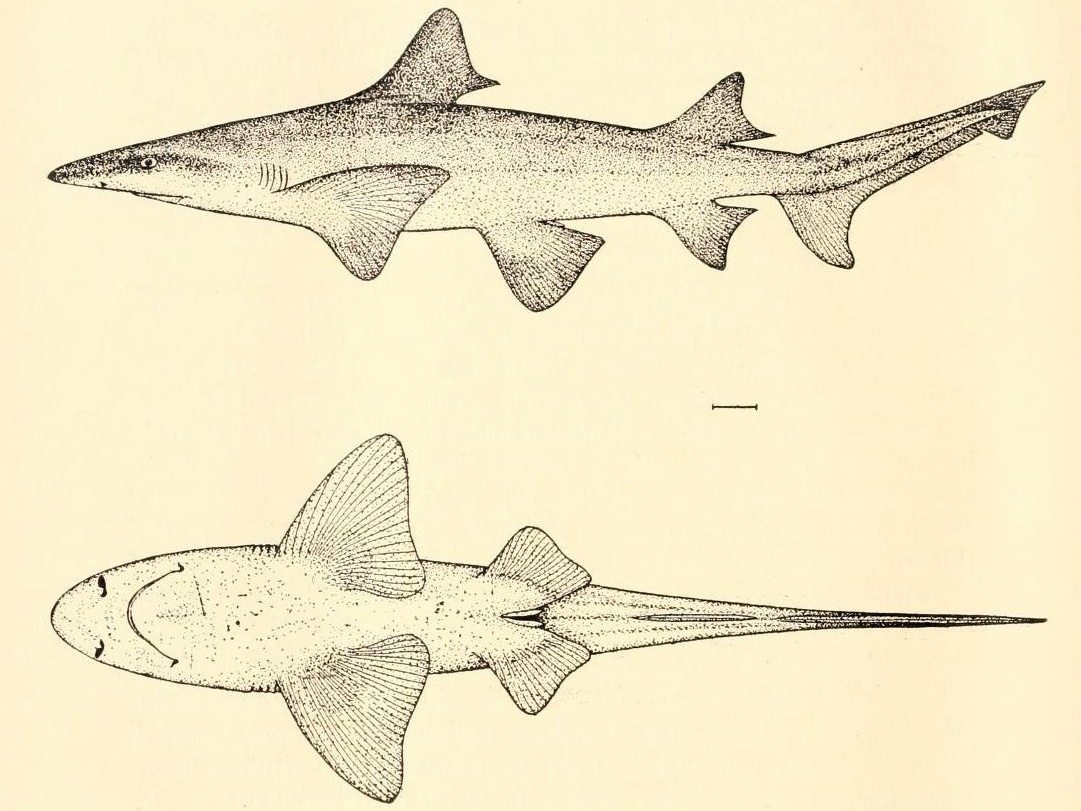

Conservation status
- Endangered (IUCN 3.1)

Scientific classification
- Kingdom: Animalia
- Phylum: Chordata
- Class: Chondrichthyes
- Subclass: Elasmobranchii
- Division: Selachii
- Order: Carcharhiniformes
- Family: Carcharhinidae
- Genus: Lamiopsis
- Species: L. tephrodes

Binomial name
- Lamiopsis tephrodes Fowler, 1905

Synonyms
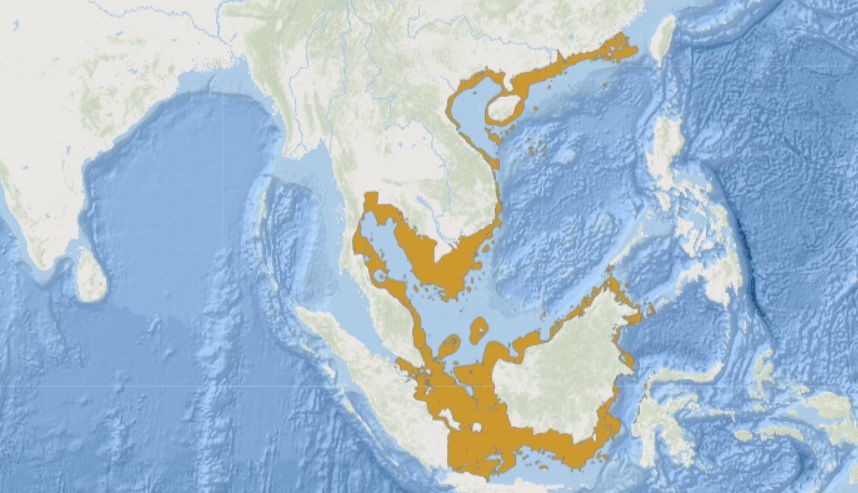
- Borneo broadfin shark range map Carcharhinus tephrodes Fowler, 1905; Carcharias tephrodes Fowler, 1905; Eulamia tephrodes Fowler, 1905

= Borneo broadfin shark =

Species of shark

The Borneo broadfin shark (Lamiopsis tephrodes) is a species of ground shark in the family Carcharhinidae, occurring in inshore waters of the western central and northwestern Pacific Ocean. It is associated with turbid estuarine environments on the continental shelf at depths of less than 50 m and is taken in a variety of coastal fisheries. The species has been assessed as Endangered under criteria A2d on the IUCN Red List due to suspected population reductions driven by intensive fishing pressure across its range.

== Taxonomy ==
Lamiopsis tephrodes was originally described as Carcharhinus tephrodes by Fowler in 1905 and has also been referred to as Carcharhinus microphthalmus Chu, 1960. It is a member of the genus Lamiopsis within the family Carcharhinidae. The taxonomy of Lamiopsis has recently been resolved, with Lamiopsis tephrodes resurrected and redescribed from Southeast Asia, and Lamiopsis temminckii redescribed from the Arabian Sea. Common names include Borneo broadfin shark (English), Hiu Bujit (Indonesian), and Yu Sirip Lebar (Malay).

== Description ==
The Borneo broadfin shark is a medium-sized shark reaching a maximum total length of 157 cm. Males mature at around 114 cm total length and females at 130 cm total length. Reproduction is placental viviparous, with litters typically comprising 4–8 pups (usually 8). Gestation lasts around eight months, and pups are born at 40–60 cm total length. The generation length is suspected to be approximately 6.5 years, based on similarity to the daggernose shark (Isogomphodon oxyrhynchus).

== Distribution and habitat ==
The Borneo broadfin shark occurs in the Western Central and Northwest Pacific. It is reported from Thailand, Indonesia, Malaysia, and is considered to occur more widely through the Indo-Malay Archipelago to southern China, with its overall range including Cambodia, China, Indonesia, Malaysia, Thailand, and Vietnam. This species is associated with inshore habitats on the continental shelf, linked to turbid estuarine waters and presumably in depths of less than 50 m. It occurs in estuaries and over subtidal sandy, sandy–muddy, and muddy substrates.

== Population ==
The current population trend of the Borneo broadfin shark is considered decreasing. No species-specific time-series data are available, but the species occurs in some of the most heavily fished and poorly monitored marine regions in the world, including parts of the South China Sea and Gulf of Thailand. Reconstructed catches and landings data for sharks, rays, skates, and carcharhinid sharks in parts of the species’ range indicate substantial declines that are used to infer population reduction for this species. In the Gulf of Thailand, landings of all combined sharks fell by 86% from 2003 to 2018, following earlier sharp declines in catch-per-unit effort after the introduction of industrial trawling in the 1960s.

In Vietnam, reconstructed catches of sharks, rays, and skates in the Exclusive Economic Zone (EEZ) declined by 97% between 1986 and 2014, despite increasing fishing effort, suggesting strong reductions in populations of these groups. In Indonesia, reconstructed carcharhinid catches increased markedly through the mid–late twentieth century before collapsing in some regions and declining in others, even as effort remained high or increased. Fisher reports from Indonesia indicate decreased catches and smaller shark sizes over recent decades, with no species reported to have increased in abundance. In Peninsular Malaysia, carcharhinid catches in western waters declined by about 66% over 40 years, and in Sarawak, reconstructed landings fell by 66% from 1997 to 2014. Market surveys in Sarawak between 2017 and 2019 recorded 42 specimens of Borneo broadfin shark, representing 0.9% of elasmobranchs on sale.

In China, reconstructed catches of sharks, rays, and skates declined by 67% between 1950 and 2014, despite substantial increases in fishing effort, with a shift towards smaller, less valuable species in the catch. When scaled to an estimated three generation lengths of 20 years, the reconstructed catch trends for Gulf of Thailand, Indonesia, Malaysia (Peninsular and Sarawak), and China correspond to inferred population reductions of 76%, 28%, 72%, and 29% respectively for carcharhinid sharks. These declines are not species-specific but indicate broad reductions in carcharhinids in the core of the Borneo broadfin shark’s range. Overall, the species is suspected to have undergone a population reduction of 50–79% over the past three generation lengths (20 years).

== Ecology and life history ==
The Borneo broadfin shark is a marine neritic species that occurs in estuarine and shallow coastal habitats. It inhabits turbid waters of the continental shelf, including estuaries and subtidal sandy, sandy–muddy, and muddy habitats, generally at depths shallower than 50 m. The species is placental viviparous, with litters typically consisting of 4–8 pups (usually 8) and a gestation period of around eight months. Size at birth is 40–60 cm total length. The generation length is suspected to be around 6.5 years.

== Threats ==
In China, intensive demersal trawling and stake net fisheries have depleted inshore resources since the 1980s, with increased vessel numbers, engine power, and fishing technology, and a long-term decline in catch-per-unit effort and fish size. Illegal, unreported, and unregulated fishing is also widespread in the Indo-Pacific region, and estimates suggest reported catches may represent only a small fraction of true catches in some areas. Such unreported catches can substantially increase the effective fishing mortality on sharks, including the Borneo broadfin shark.

The species is also affected by coastal habitat destruction and degradation, including loss of mangroves, seagrass, and other coastal wetlands in the South China Sea region, where inshore habitats have been heavily modified. The Borneo broadfin shark is heavily impacted by fishing pressure across its range. It is taken in a variety of fishing gears, including demersal trawls and inshore gillnets, particularly in areas influenced by river run-off such as Mukah, Sarawak, Malaysian Borneo. Species-specific catch data are scarce, but shallow-water demersal coastal resources in Southeast Asia have been severely depleted, and coastal and shelf fisheries are generally considered unsustainable. Across much of its range, shark fishing (both targeted and as bycatch) is widespread, intensive, and often unregulated. Practices are generally regarded as unsustainable, with high levels of exploitation documented in regional shark and ray fisheries. In Thailand, fishing effort has increased dramatically since 1950 across subsistence, artisanal, and industrial sectors, and most fisheries are considered overexploited. The current fishing effort on demersal marine fish stocks in the Gulf of Thailand is estimated at about one-third greater than Maximum Sustainable Yield, with declining catch-per-unit effort in most fisheries. In Vietnam, shark fisheries developed in the 1980s in response to demand for shark fins and other products and subsequently declined as stocks became depleted. Most marine stocks are now considered fully or overexploited, with weak enforcement and largely unregulated fisheries, dominated by small-scale sectors that operate in shallow inshore waters where the Borneo broadfin shark occurs.

In Indonesia, sharks are an important resource and a main livelihood for some communities. Fisheries production and the number of fishers have grown substantially since the mid-twentieth century, with small-scale fisheries comprising the majority of production and effort. Indonesia has been one of the top shark-fishing nations for more than two decades, with reported annual landings over 100,000 t and a high economic value in export trade. In Malaysia, fisheries are an important economic sector and fishing effort has increased substantially since 1950. Inshore fisheries were fully exploited by the late 1970s, and small-scale fisheries concentrated in shallow coastal waters and reefs have contributed to habitat destruction and reduced fish abundance.

== Use and trade ==
The meat of the Borneo broadfin shark is often sold fresh for human consumption in local markets across parts of its range. Its fins are dried and traded internationally.

== Conservation ==
The Borneo broadfin shark is listed as Endangered under criteria A2d on the IUCN Red List, based on suspected population reductions of 50–79% over three generation lengths (20 years) inferred from reconstructed catches and intensive fishing pressure across its range. No species-specific conservation measures are currently in place for Lamiopsis tephrodes. In Indonesia, trawl nets were banned in 1980, although large numbers of smaller trawls (Lampara) are still used. A subsequent ban on seine nets (Cantrang) was intended to be fully implemented in 2020, but there are plans to lift bans and allow some gear types to operate with spatial restrictions. There are reported to be no marine protected areas within its Indonesian distribution. In China, seasonal closures on commercial demersal trawling in parts of the South China Sea were introduced in the late 1990s and later extended to include other commercial gears, with strengthened enforcement since 2017. Numerous coastal marine protected areas exist, and it is estimated that around 20% of the Chinese coastline is included in protected areas. Proposed conservation needs for the Borneo broadfin shark include species protection, spatial management, bycatch mitigation, harvest and trade management measures (including possible international trade measures), improved enforcement, training and capacity-building, better species identification, and catch monitoring to understand population trends and inform management.

== See also ==
- List of sharks
