= Dense-scale lantern shark =

Dense-scale lanternshark

Conservation status
- Least Concern (IUCN 3.1)

Scientific classification
- Kingdom: Animalia
- Phylum: Chordata
- Class: Chondrichthyes
- Subclass: Elasmobranchii
- Division: Selachii
- Order: Squaliformes
- Family: Etmopteridae
- Genus: Etmopterus
- Species: E. pycnolepis

Binomial name
- Etmopterus pycnolepis Kotlyar, 1990
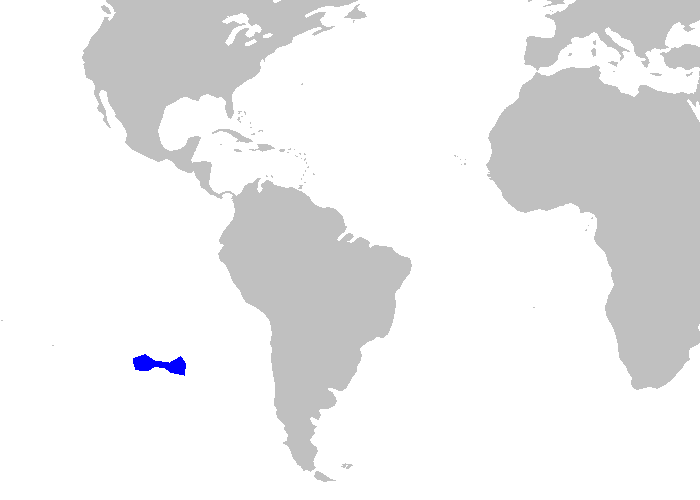
- Range of the dense-scale lanternshark (in blue)

Species of shark

The dense-scale lanternshark (Etmopterus pycnolepis) is a shark of the family Etmopteridae found in the southeast Pacific off Peru and Chile.
