= Seychelles spurdog =

Conservation status
- Least Concern (IUCN 3.1)

Scientific classification
- Kingdom: Animalia
- Phylum: Chordata
- Class: Chondrichthyes
- Subclass: Elasmobranchii
- Division: Selachii
- Order: Squaliformes
- Family: Squalidae
- Genus: Squalus
- Species: S. lalannei

Binomial name
- Squalus lalannei Baranes, 2003

Species of shark

The Seychelles spurdog (Squalus lalannei) is a dogfish described in 2003. It is a member of the family Squalidae, found off the Seychelles. The length of the longest specimen measured is 61.5 cm (24.2 in).
