= Lined lanternshark =

There are two species named lined lanternshark:

- Etmopterus bullisi, found the western Atlantic
- Etmopterus dislineatus
