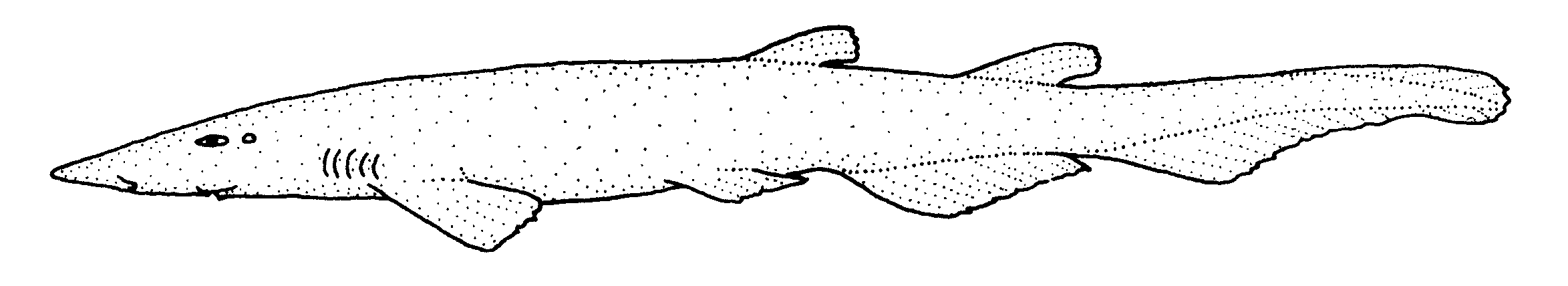
- Drawing by Dr Tony Ayling

Conservation status
- Least Concern (IUCN 3.1)

Scientific classification
- Kingdom: Animalia
- Phylum: Chordata
- Class: Chondrichthyes
- Subclass: Elasmobranchii
- Division: Selachii
- Order: Carcharhiniformes
- Family: Pentanchidae
- Genus: Apristurus
- Species: A. macrorhynchus

Binomial name
- Apristurus macrorhynchus (S. Tanaka (I), 1909)
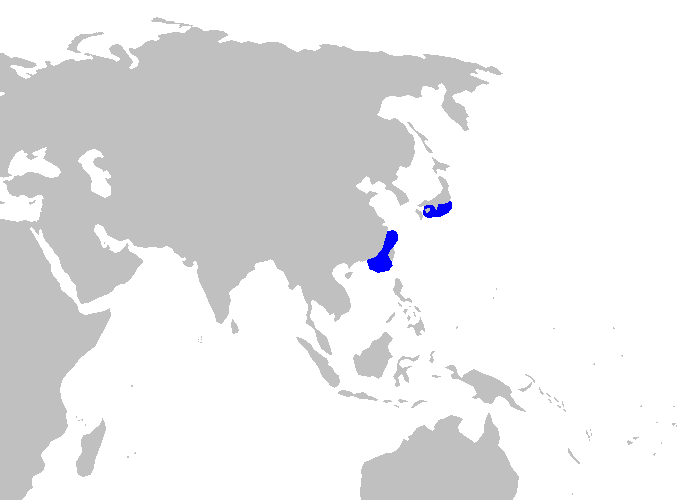
- Range of the flathead catshark (in blue)

= Flathead catshark =

Species of shark

The flathead catshark (Apristurus macrorhynchus) is a species of shark of the family Pentanchidae, the deepwater catsharks, in the order Carcharhiniformes, found in the deep waters of the northwest Pacific Ocean.
