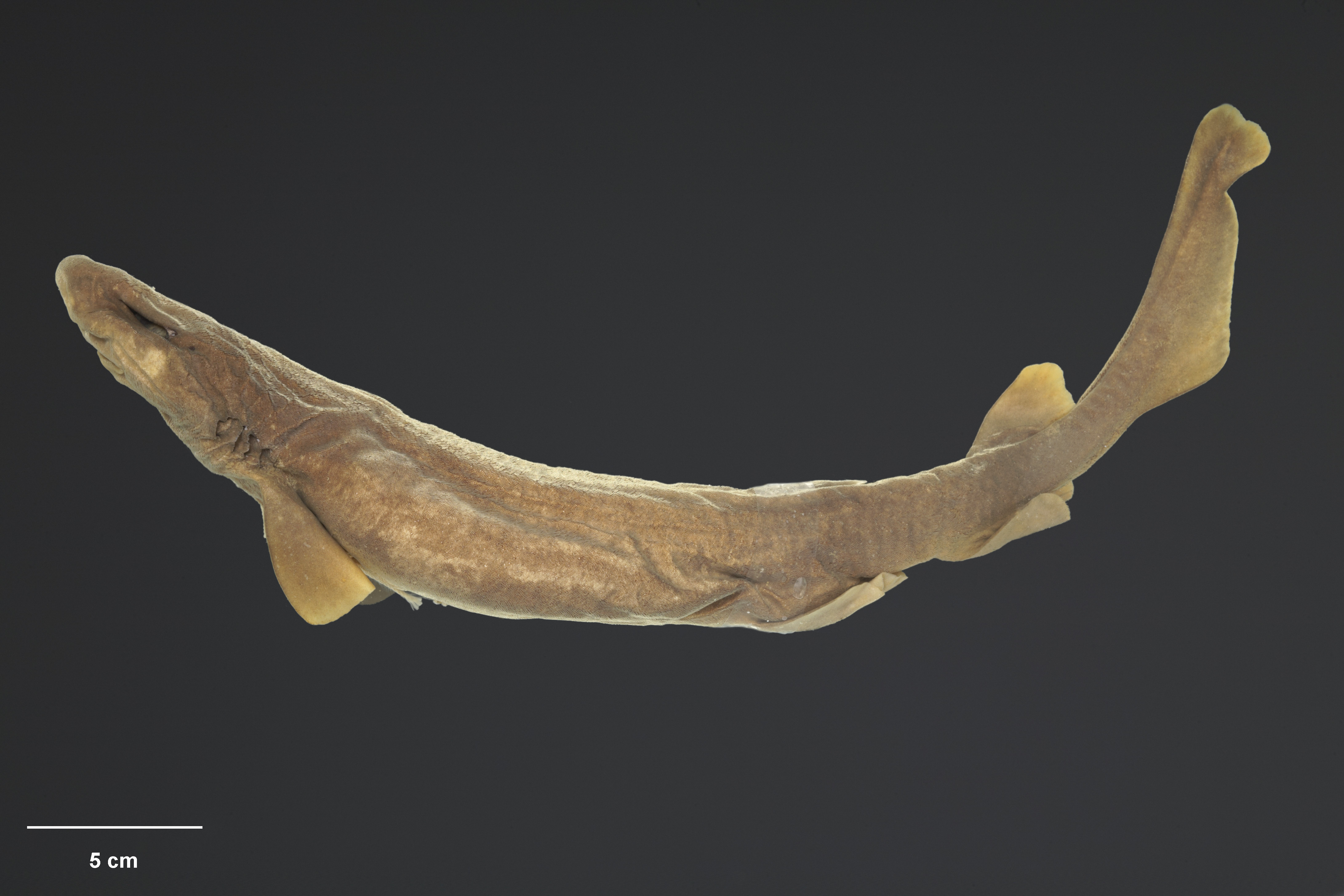
- Type specimen from Te Papa collections

Conservation status
- Data Deficient (IUCN 3.1)

Scientific classification
- Kingdom: Animalia
- Phylum: Chordata
- Class: Chondrichthyes
- Subclass: Elasmobranchii
- Division: Selachii
- Order: Carcharhiniformes
- Family: Pentanchidae
- Genus: Parmaturus
- Species: P. macmillani

Binomial name
- Parmaturus macmillani Hardy, 1985
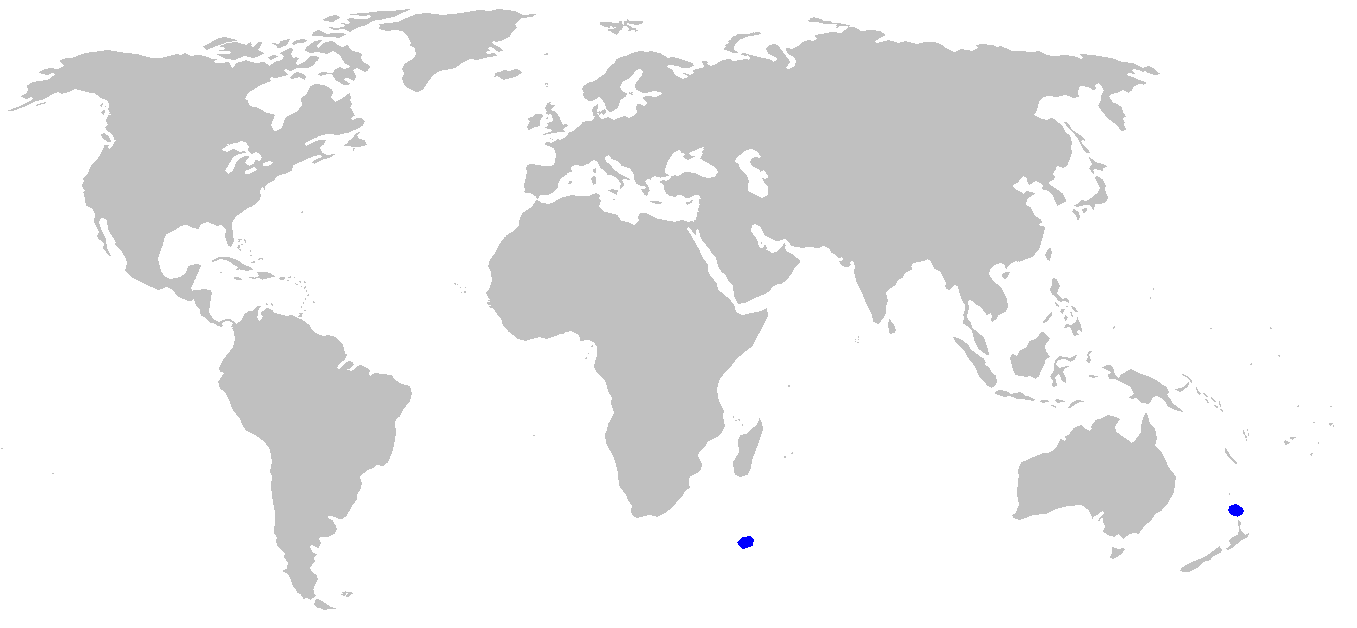

= McMillan's catshark =

Species of shark

McMillan's catshark (Parmaturus macmillani) is a species of shark belonging to the family Pentanchidae, the deepwater catsharks, in the order Carcharhiniformes. McMillan's catshark is a small, rare, and little-known deepwater shark that is endemic to New Zealand. It is found at depths of 985–1350m on the lower continental slope around New Zealand, on the West Norfolk Ridge, and off North Cape. It can grow to a length of 45 cm.

== Conservation status ==
In 2017, the International Union for Conservation of Nature assesses this species as Data Deficient. In June 2018, the New Zealand Department of Conservation classified McMillan's catshark as "Data Deficient" with the qualifier "Uncertain whether Secure Overseas" under the New Zealand Threat Classification System.
