= Shortnose demon catshark =

Conservation status
- Least Concern (IUCN 3.1)

Scientific classification
- Kingdom: Animalia
- Phylum: Chordata
- Class: Chondrichthyes
- Subclass: Elasmobranchii
- Division: Selachii
- Order: Carcharhiniformes
- Family: Pentanchidae
- Genus: Apristurus
- Species: A. internatus

Binomial name
- Apristurus internatus S. M. Deng, G. Q. Xiong & H. X. Zhan, 1988
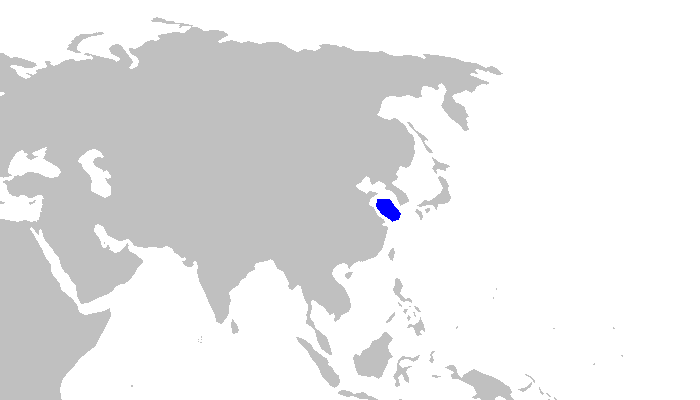

Species of shark

The shortnose demon catshark (Apristurus internatus) is a shark of the family Pentanchidae, the deepwater catsharks. This species is found only in deep water in the East China Sea. Its length is up to 40 cm. A. internatus is known only from the holotype (a 49.1-cm-total length female) and a paratype (a 40.3-cm male), both caught in the East China Sea, probably taken as bycatch in deepwater trawl fisheries. The reproduction of this catshark is oviparous.
