= Orange-spotted catshark =

Conservation status
- Least Concern (IUCN 3.1)

Scientific classification
- Kingdom: Animalia
- Phylum: Chordata
- Class: Chondrichthyes
- Subclass: Elasmobranchii
- Division: Selachii
- Order: Carcharhiniformes
- Family: Pentanchidae
- Genus: Asymbolus
- Species: A. rubiginosus

Binomial name
- Asymbolus rubiginosus Last, M. F. Gomon & Gledhill, 1999
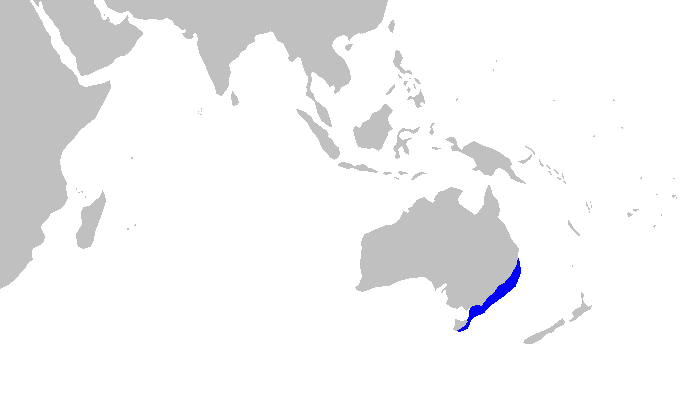

Species of shark

The orange-spotted catshark or rusty catshark (Asymbolus rubiginosus) is a species of shark belonging to the family Pentanchidae, the deepwater catsharks. It is found only off the coast of Western Australia, at depths between 25 and 540 metres (82 and 1,772 ft). Its length is up to 39 centimetres (15 in).
