= Humpback catshark =

Conservation status
- Least Concern (IUCN 3.1)

Scientific classification
- Kingdom: Animalia
- Phylum: Chordata
- Class: Chondrichthyes
- Subclass: Elasmobranchii
- Division: Selachii
- Order: Carcharhiniformes
- Family: Pentanchidae
- Genus: Apristurus
- Species: A. gibbosus

Binomial name
- Apristurus gibbosus Y. T. Chu, Q. W. Meng & S. Li, 1985
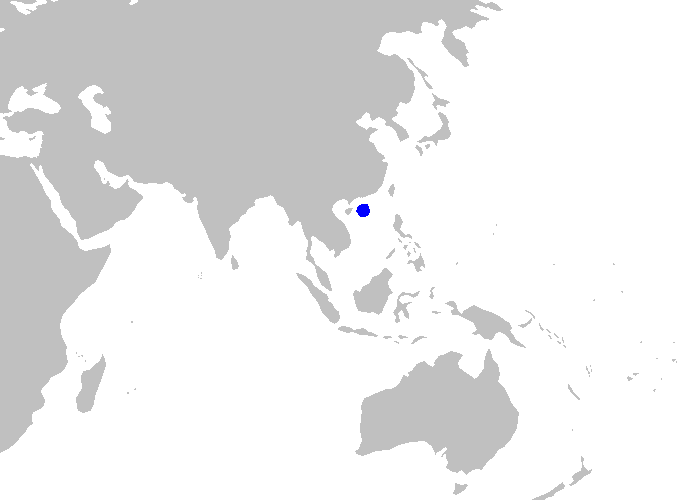

Species of shark

The humpback cat shark (Apristurus gibbosus) is a shark of the family Pentanchidae, the deepwater catsharks, in the order Carcharhiniformes, found in the northwest Pacific Ocean off Zhujiang, South China Sea, from the surface to 915 m. Its length is 39–41 cm. The largest specimen examined by Nakaya and Sato was 54.2 cm TL. The humpback catshark is a little-known oviparous deepwater catshark.
