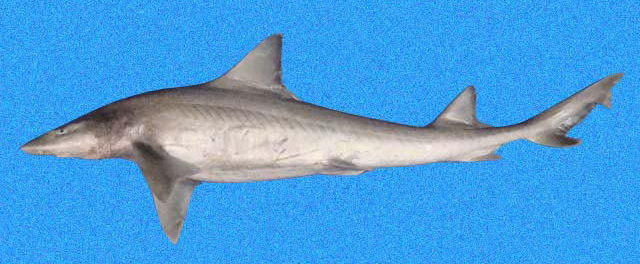

Conservation status
- Least Concern (IUCN 3.1)

Scientific classification
- Kingdom: Animalia
- Phylum: Chordata
- Class: Chondrichthyes
- Subclass: Elasmobranchii
- Division: Selachii
- Order: Carcharhiniformes
- Family: Triakidae
- Genus: Mustelus
- Species: M. sinusmexicanus

Binomial name
- Mustelus sinusmexicanus Heemstra, 1997
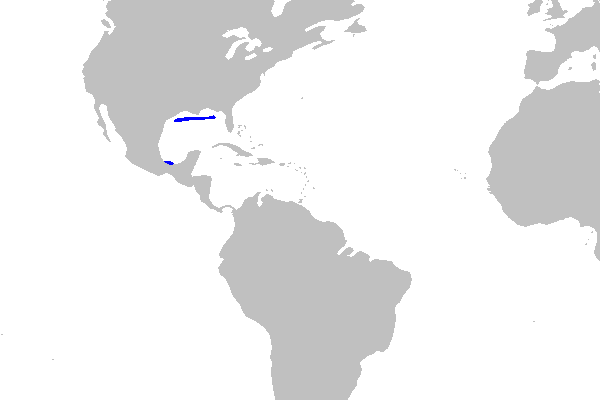

= Gulf smooth-hound =

Species of shark

The Gulf smooth-hound (Mustelus sinusmexicanus) is a houndshark of the family Triakidae, found on the continental shelves of the tropical western central Atlantic. The reproduction of this houndshark is placental viviparous.

== Description ==
This species has a long slender body, a plain grey/brown dorsum, pale/white ventrum and a large and rounded dorsal fin. The fins have a pale to white trailing margin fading towards adulthood. The caudal fin is deeply notched; its teeth are flat and pale. This type of shark can be found in the continental shelf between depths of 36 to 229 m (118 to 751 ft). The maximum recorded size was 140 cm (55 in).

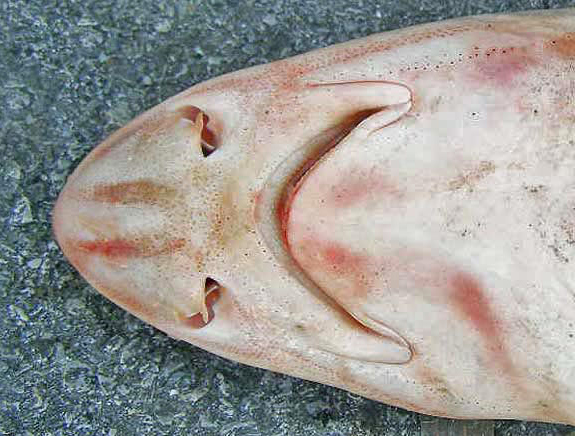
Head

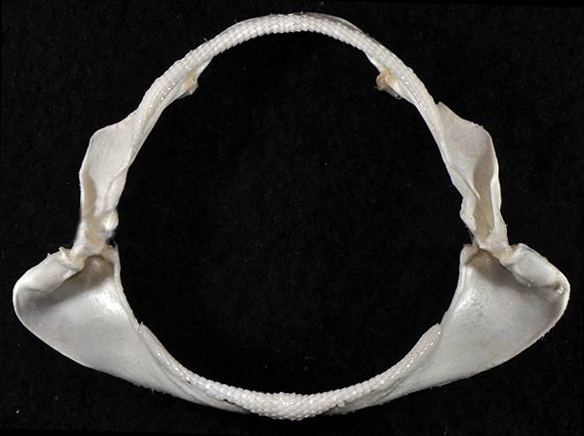
Jaws

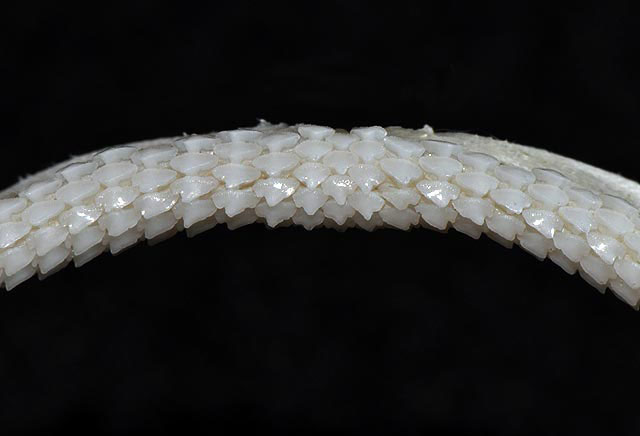
Upper teeth

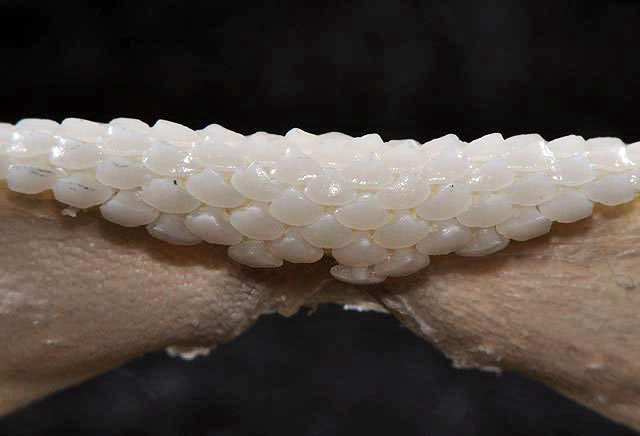
Lower teeth
