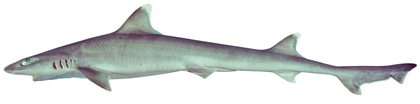

Conservation status
- Least Concern (IUCN 3.1)

Scientific classification
- Kingdom: Animalia
- Phylum: Chordata
- Class: Chondrichthyes
- Subclass: Elasmobranchii
- Division: Selachii
- Order: Carcharhiniformes
- Family: Triakidae
- Genus: Hemitriakis
- Species: H. abdita

Binomial name
- Hemitriakis abdita Compagno & Stevens, 1993
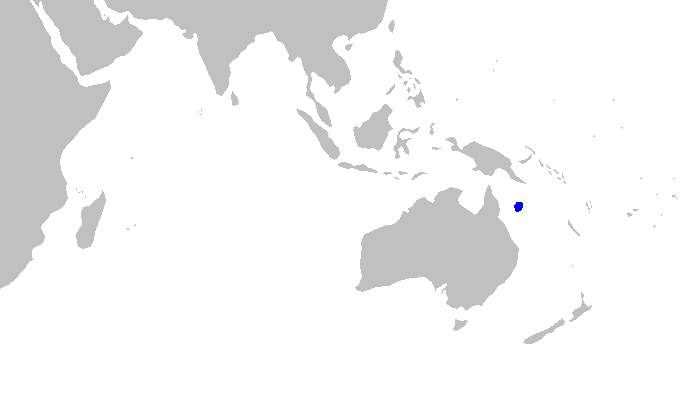

= Deepwater sicklefin houndshark =

Species of shark

The deepwater sicklefin houndshark (Hemitriakis abdita) or the darksnout houndshark, is a houndshark of the family Triakidae. It is found in the western central Pacific, in the Coral Sea off Queensland and in the waters off New Caledonia.
