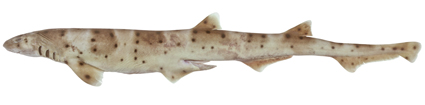

Conservation status
- Least Concern (IUCN 3.1)

Scientific classification
- Kingdom: Animalia
- Phylum: Chordata
- Class: Chondrichthyes
- Subclass: Elasmobranchii
- Division: Selachii
- Order: Carcharhiniformes
- Family: Pentanchidae
- Genus: Asymbolus
- Species: A. occiduus

Binomial name
- Asymbolus occiduus Last, M. F. Gomon & Gledhill, 1999
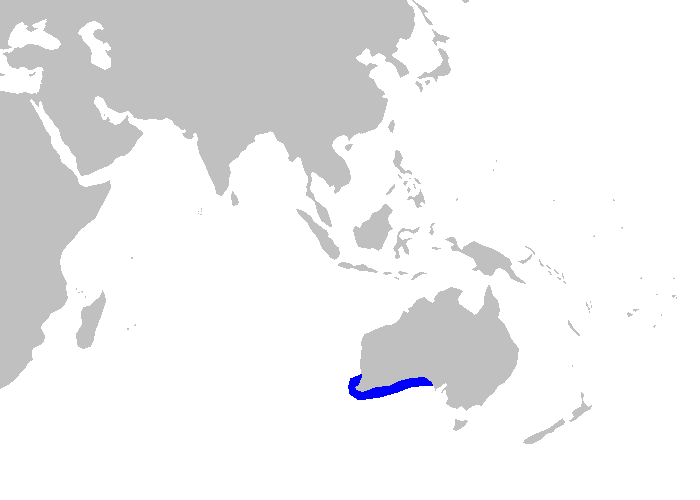

= Western spotted catshark =

Species of shark

The western spotted catshark (Asymbolus occiduus) is a species of shark belonging to the family Pentanchidae, the deepwater catsharks. This species is found only around southwestern Australia, at depths between 100 and 400 m (330 and 1,310 ft). Males can grow up to 60 cm (24 in) in length, while females have a maximum length of 53 cm (21 in). The western spotted catshark reproduces via oviparity.
