= Steven's swellshark =

Scientific classification
- Kingdom: Animalia
- Phylum: Chordata
- Class: Chondrichthyes
- Subclass: Elasmobranchii
- Division: Selachii
- Order: Carcharhiniformes
- Family: Scyliorhinidae
- Genus: Cephaloscyllium
- Species: C. stevensi

Binomial name
- Cephaloscyllium stevensi E. Clark & J. E. Randall, 2011

Species of shark

Steven's swellshark (Cephaloscyllium stevensi) is a species of swellshark which resides in the waters around Papua New Guinea. It was described by Clark and Randall in 2011.
