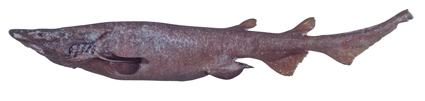

Conservation status
- Least Concern (IUCN 3.1)

Scientific classification
- Kingdom: Animalia
- Phylum: Chordata
- Class: Chondrichthyes
- Subclass: Elasmobranchii
- Division: Selachii
- Order: Carcharhiniformes
- Family: Pentanchidae
- Genus: Apristurus
- Species: A. pinguis

Binomial name
- Apristurus pinguis S. M. Deng, G. Q. Xiong & H. X. Zhan, 1983
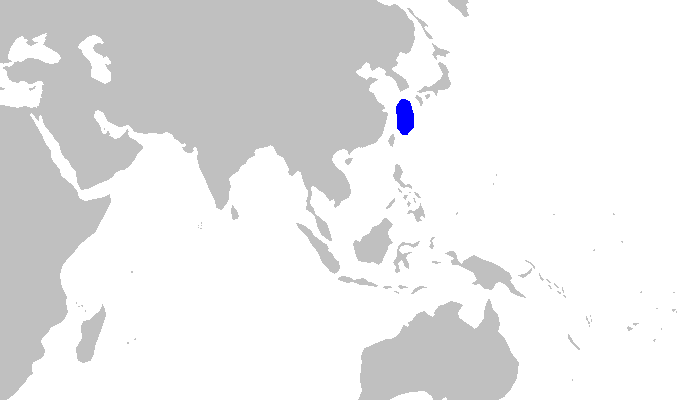

= Bulldog catshark =

Species of shark

The bulldog catshark (Apristurus pinguis) is a species of shark belonging to the family Pentanchidae, the deepwater catsharks. This shark is found in the deep waters of the East China Sea and in the Northwest Pacific. In New Zealand waters it is found at the Reinga Ridge, the West Norfolk Ridge, the Hikurangi Trough and the Chatham Rise as well as on the Campbell Plateau.

== Description ==
The overall colouration of this species is brown or a brownish shade with its palate and tongue being dark. Its length is up to 83.5 cm.

== Conservation status ==
The New Zealand Department of Conservation has classified the flaccid catshark as "Data deficient" under the New Zealand Threat Classification System.
