= Sparsetooth dogfish =

Conservation status
- Least Concern (IUCN 3.1)

Scientific classification
- Kingdom: Animalia
- Phylum: Chordata
- Class: Chondrichthyes
- Subclass: Elasmobranchii
- Division: Selachii
- Order: Squaliformes
- Family: Somniosidae
- Genus: Scymnodalatias
- Species: S. oligodon

Binomial name
- Scymnodalatias oligodon Kukuev & Konovalenko, 1988
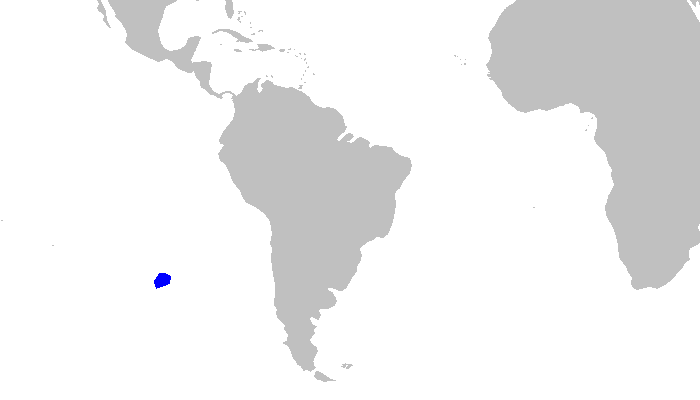
- Range of the sparsetooth dogfish (in blue)

Species of shark

The sparsetooth dogfish (Scymnodalatias oligodon) is a very rare sleeper shark of the family Somniosidae, the holotype of which was taken in the subtropical southeast Pacific at a depth of up to 200 m. Its biology is unknown.
