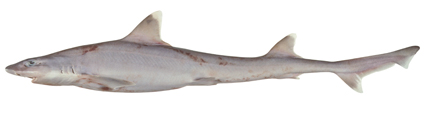

Conservation status
- Least Concern (IUCN 3.1)

Scientific classification
- Kingdom: Animalia
- Phylum: Chordata
- Class: Chondrichthyes
- Subclass: Elasmobranchii
- Division: Selachii
- Order: Carcharhiniformes
- Family: Triakidae
- Genus: Hemitriakis
- Species: H. falcata

Binomial name
- Hemitriakis falcata Compagno & Stevens, 1993
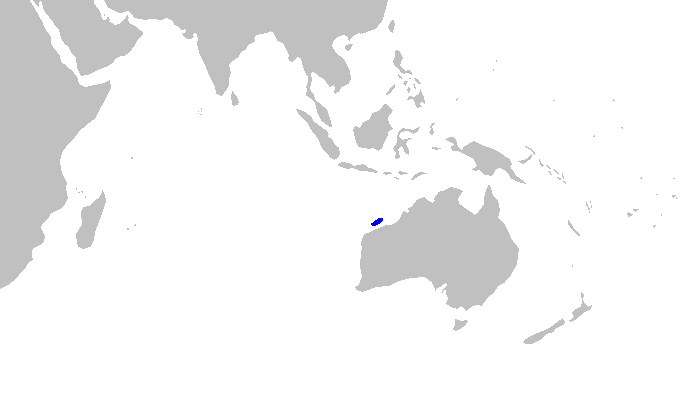

= Sicklefin houndshark =

Species of shark

The sicklefin houndshark (Hemitriakis falcata) is a rare houndshark of the family Triakidae, endemic to Western Australia. The holotype was collected from a depth of 150 metres (490 ft) Its reproduction is ovoviviparous.
