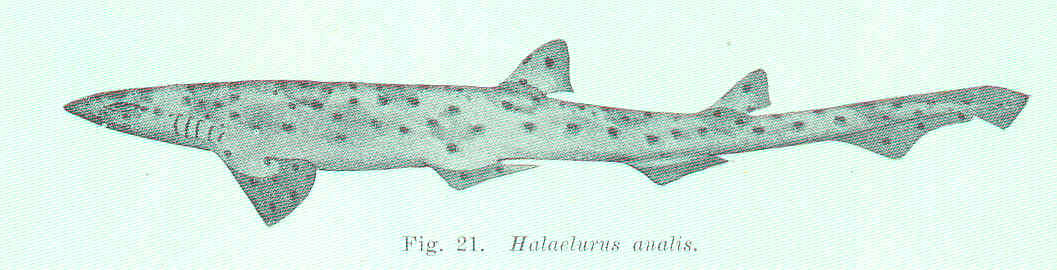

Conservation status
- Least Concern (IUCN 3.1)

Scientific classification
- Kingdom: Animalia
- Phylum: Chordata
- Class: Chondrichthyes
- Subclass: Elasmobranchii
- Division: Selachii
- Order: Carcharhiniformes
- Family: Pentanchidae
- Genus: Asymbolus
- Species: A. analis

Binomial name
- Asymbolus analis (J. D. Ogilby, 1885)
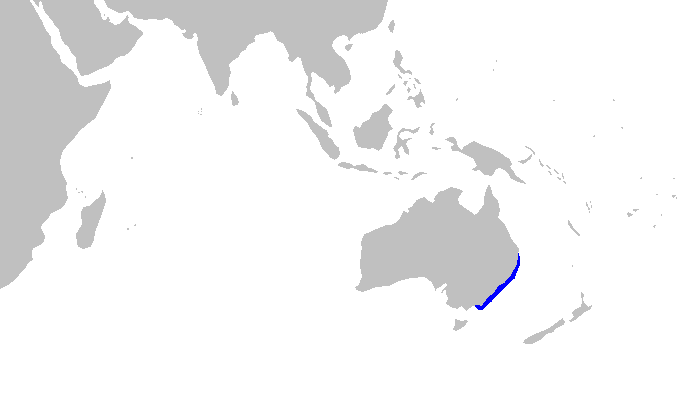

= Australian spotted catshark =

Species of shark

The Australian spotted catshark (Asymbolus analis) is a species of shark belonging to the family Pentanchidae, the deepwater catsharks. This species is found only around Australia between 32 and 38°S, at depths between 10 and 180 m (33 and 591 ft). It can grow up to 90 cm (35 in). Females of this species were observed as being reproductive year round. They are also confirmed as being a single oviparous species.
