= Ambon catshark =

Conservation status
- Data Deficient (IUCN 3.1)

Scientific classification
- Kingdom: Animalia
- Phylum: Chordata
- Class: Chondrichthyes
- Subclass: Elasmobranchii
- Division: Selachii
- Order: Carcharhiniformes
- Family: Pentanchidae
- Genus: Akheilos; W. T. White, Fahmi & Weigmann, 2019
- Species: A. suwartanai

Binomial name
- Akheilos suwartanai W.T. White, Fahmi & Weigmann, 2019

Species of fish

The Ambon catshark (Akheilos suwartanai) is a species of shark belonging to the family Pentanchidae, the deepwater catsharks. This is the only species in the monospecific genus Akheilos. The type locality is Rumahkay, southwest of Seram Island between Seram and Ambon Islands in eastern Indonesia.
