= Smalldorsal catshark =

Conservation status
- Least Concern (IUCN 3.1)

Scientific classification
- Kingdom: Animalia
- Phylum: Chordata
- Class: Chondrichthyes
- Subclass: Elasmobranchii
- Division: Selachii
- Order: Carcharhiniformes
- Family: Pentanchidae
- Genus: Apristurus
- Species: A. micropterygeus

Binomial name
- Apristurus micropterygeus Q. W. Meng, Y. T. Chu & S. Li, 1986
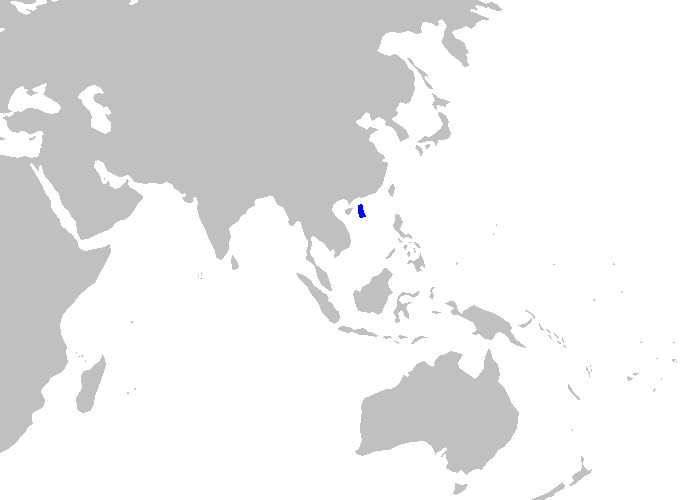

Species of shark

The smalldorsal cat shark (Apristurus micropterygeus) is a species of shark belonging to the family Pentanchidae, the deepwater catsharks. This shark is found in the South China Sea, at depths to 915 m. It can grow up to 37 cm. A. micropterygeus is unique among its species in having a narrow and sharply pointed first dorsal fin. However, Nakaya and Sato (2000) recommended that the status of the species be reviewed once additional specimens are available, citing the possibility that the dorsal fin of the holotype may have been malformed. The reproduction of the smalldorsal catshark is oviparous.
