= Mustelus mangalorensis =

Scientific classification
- Domain: Eukaryota
- Kingdom: Animalia
- Phylum: Chordata
- Class: Chondrichthyes
- Subclass: Elasmobranchii
- Division: Selachii
- Order: Carcharhiniformes
- Family: Triakidae
- Genus: Mustelus
- Species: M. mangalorensis

Binomial name
- Mustelus mangalorensis Cubelio, Remya R & Kurup, 2011

Species of shark

Mustelus mangalorensis also known as the Mangalore houndshark is a species of houndshark in the family Triakidae, found in the Gulf of Aden near southwest India and the Indian Ocean.
