= Spotless catshark =

Conservation status
- Least Concern (IUCN 3.1)

Scientific classification
- Kingdom: Animalia
- Phylum: Chordata
- Class: Chondrichthyes
- Subclass: Elasmobranchii
- Division: Selachii
- Order: Carcharhiniformes
- Family: Pentanchidae
- Genus: Bythaelurus
- Species: B. immaculatus

Binomial name
- Bythaelurus immaculatus (Y. T. Chu & Q. W. Meng, 1982)
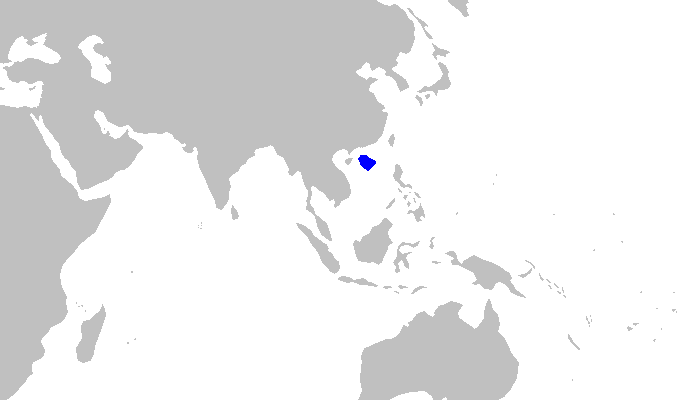

Synonyms
- Halaelurus immaculatus Y. T. Chu & Q. W. Meng, 1982

Species of shark

The spotless catshark (Bythaelurus immaculatus) is a species of shark belonging to the family Pentanchidae, the deepwater catsharks> this species is found in the South China Sea at depths between 535 and 1,020 m (1,755 and 3,346 ft) on the continental slope. Its length is up to 71 centimetres (28 in).
