= Milk-eye catshark =

Conservation status
- Least Concern (IUCN 3.1)

Scientific classification
- Kingdom: Animalia
- Phylum: Chordata
- Class: Chondrichthyes
- Subclass: Elasmobranchii
- Division: Selachii
- Order: Carcharhiniformes
- Family: Pentanchidae
- Genus: Apristurus
- Species: A. nakayai

Binomial name
- Apristurus nakayai Iglésias, 2013

Species of shark

The milk-eye catshark (Apristurus nakayai) is a species of shark in the family Scyliorhinidae found in Coriolis Bank off western New Caledonia. Its natural habitat is the open seas. The new deep-water catshark, Apristurus nakayai, is described from northern New Caledonian waters.
