= Grinning Izak =

Conservation status
- Data Deficient (IUCN 3.1)

Scientific classification
- Kingdom: Animalia
- Phylum: Chordata
- Class: Chondrichthyes
- Subclass: Elasmobranchii
- Division: Selachii
- Order: Carcharhiniformes
- Family: Pentanchidae
- Genus: Holohalaelurus
- Species: H. grennian

Binomial name
- Holohalaelurus grennian Human, 2006

Species of shark

The grinning Izak or East African spotted Izak (Holohalaelurus grennian) is a species of shark belonging to the family Pentanchidae, the deepwater catsharks. This species is found in the waters of the Western Indian Ocean, near Kenya.
