= Squalus clarkae =

Genie's dogfish

Conservation status
- Least Concern (IUCN 3.1)

Scientific classification
- Kingdom: Animalia
- Phylum: Chordata
- Class: Chondrichthyes
- Subclass: Elasmobranchii
- Division: Selachii
- Order: Squaliformes
- Family: Squalidae
- Genus: Squalus
- Species: S. clarkae

Binomial name
- Squalus clarkae Pfleger, Grubbs, Cotton & Daly-Engel, 2018

Species of shark

Squalus clarkae, also known as Genie's dogfish, is a species of shark from the Gulf of Mexico and western Atlantic. It was described in 2018 and named in honor of ichthyologist Eugenie Clark. It was previously believed to be a part of Squalus mitsukurii, but genetic analysis revealed it to be a distinct species. Individuals are usually between 50 centimetres (20 in) and 70 centimetres (28 in) long. This species is known to be longer in length in comparison to the Squalus Mitsukurii. Their first dorsal fin is also structured differently than the other species in the genus Squalus.
