= Pale spotted catshark =

Conservation status
- Least Concern (IUCN 3.1)

Scientific classification
- Kingdom: Animalia
- Phylum: Chordata
- Class: Chondrichthyes
- Subclass: Elasmobranchii
- Division: Selachii
- Order: Carcharhiniformes
- Family: Pentanchidae
- Genus: Asymbolus
- Species: A. pallidus

Binomial name
- Asymbolus pallidus Last, M. F. Gomon & Gledhill, 1999
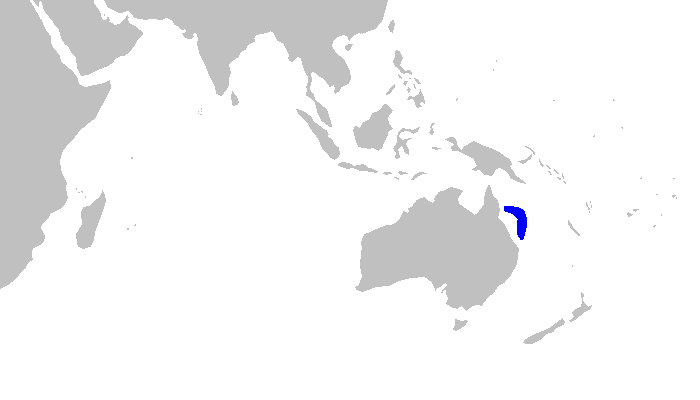

Species of shark

The pale spotted catshark (Asymbolus pallidus) is a species of shark belonging to the family Pentanchidae, the deepwater catsharks. this shark is found only off Queensland, at depths of between 225 and 400 m (738 and 1,312 ft). Its length is up to 44 cm (17 in).
