= Carcharhinus humani =

Conservation status
- Data Deficient (IUCN 3.1)

Scientific classification
- Kingdom: Animalia
- Phylum: Chordata
- Class: Chondrichthyes
- Subclass: Elasmobranchii
- Division: Selachii
- Order: Carcharhiniformes
- Family: Carcharhinidae
- Genus: Carcharhinus
- Species: C. humani

Binomial name
- Carcharhinus humani W. T. White & Weigmann, 2014
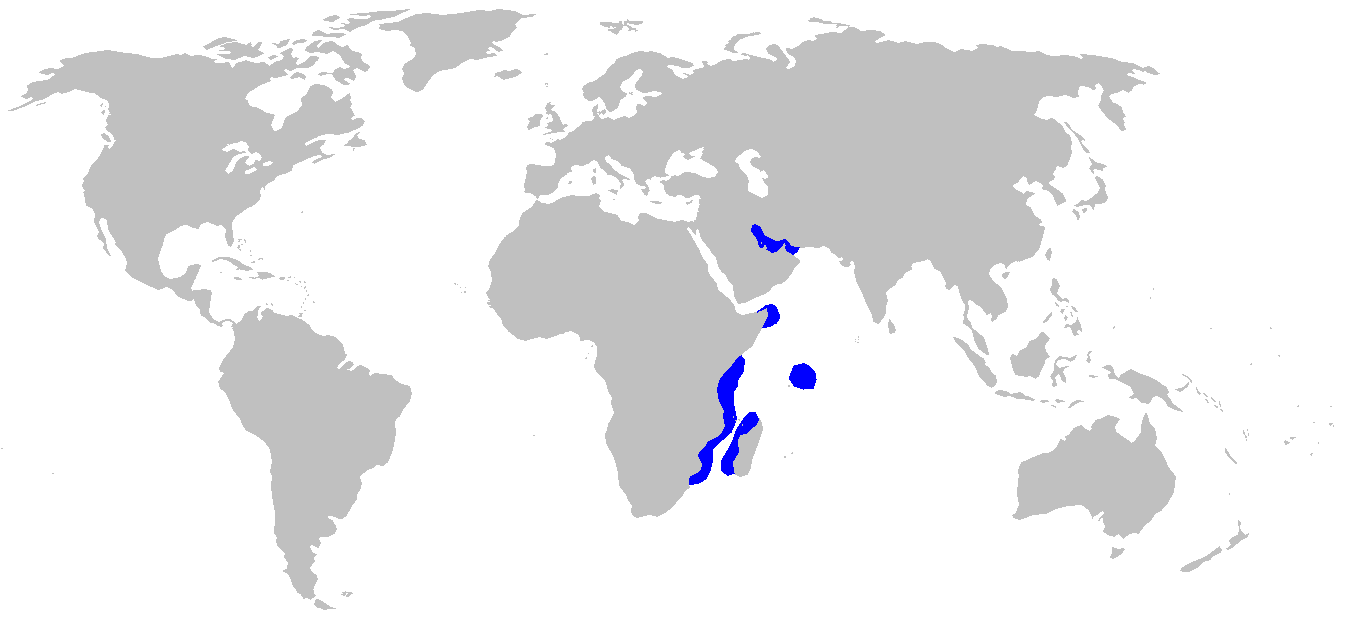
- Human's whaler shark range

Species of shark

Carcharhinus humani, also known as the Human's whaler shark, is a species of requiem shark, in the family Carcharhinidae. It inhabits the western Indian Ocean near the Socotra Islands, off Kuwait, Mozambique, and South Africa.
