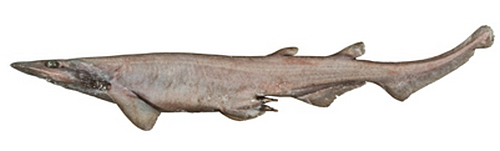

Conservation status
- Data Deficient (IUCN 3.1)

Scientific classification
- Kingdom: Animalia
- Phylum: Chordata
- Class: Chondrichthyes
- Subclass: Elasmobranchii
- Division: Selachii
- Order: Carcharhiniformes
- Family: Pentanchidae
- Genus: Apristurus
- Species: A. sinensis

Binomial name
- Apristurus sinensis Y. T. Chu & A. S. Hu, 1981
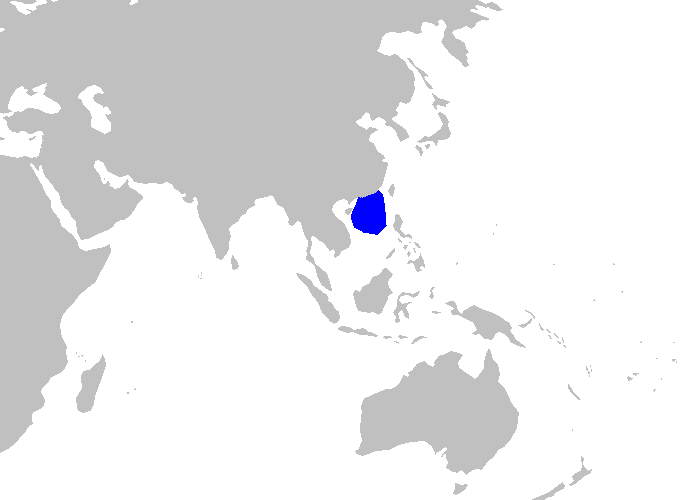

= South China catshark =

Species of shark

The South China catshark (Apristurus sinensis) is a species of shark belonging to the family Pentanchidae, the deepwater catsharks. This catshark is known only from the holotype, which was taken from the South China Sea at a depth of 537 m (1,762 ft). Its length is 42 cm (17 in), but this measurement was taken from an immature specimen. The reproduction of the South China catshark is oviparous.
