= Comoro catshark =

Conservation status
- Data Deficient (IUCN 3.1)

Scientific classification
- Kingdom: Animalia
- Phylum: Chordata
- Class: Chondrichthyes
- Subclass: Elasmobranchii
- Division: Selachii
- Order: Carcharhiniformes
- Family: Scyliorhinidae
- Genus: Scyliorhinus
- Species: S. comoroensis

Binomial name
- Scyliorhinus comoroensis Compagno, 1988
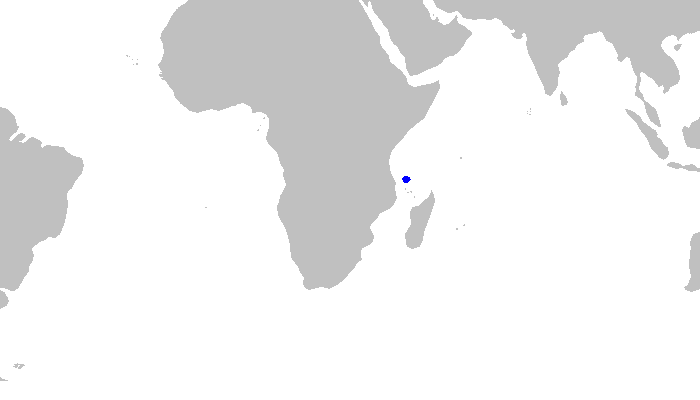

Species of shark

The Comoro catshark (Scyliorhinus comoroensis) is a rare catshark of the family Scyliorhinidae. The holotype and only specimen was taken from the Comoros Islands in the Indian Ocean, at a depth of 400 metres (1,300 ft). The Comoro catshark is not well-documented. The reproduction of this catshark is oviparous.
