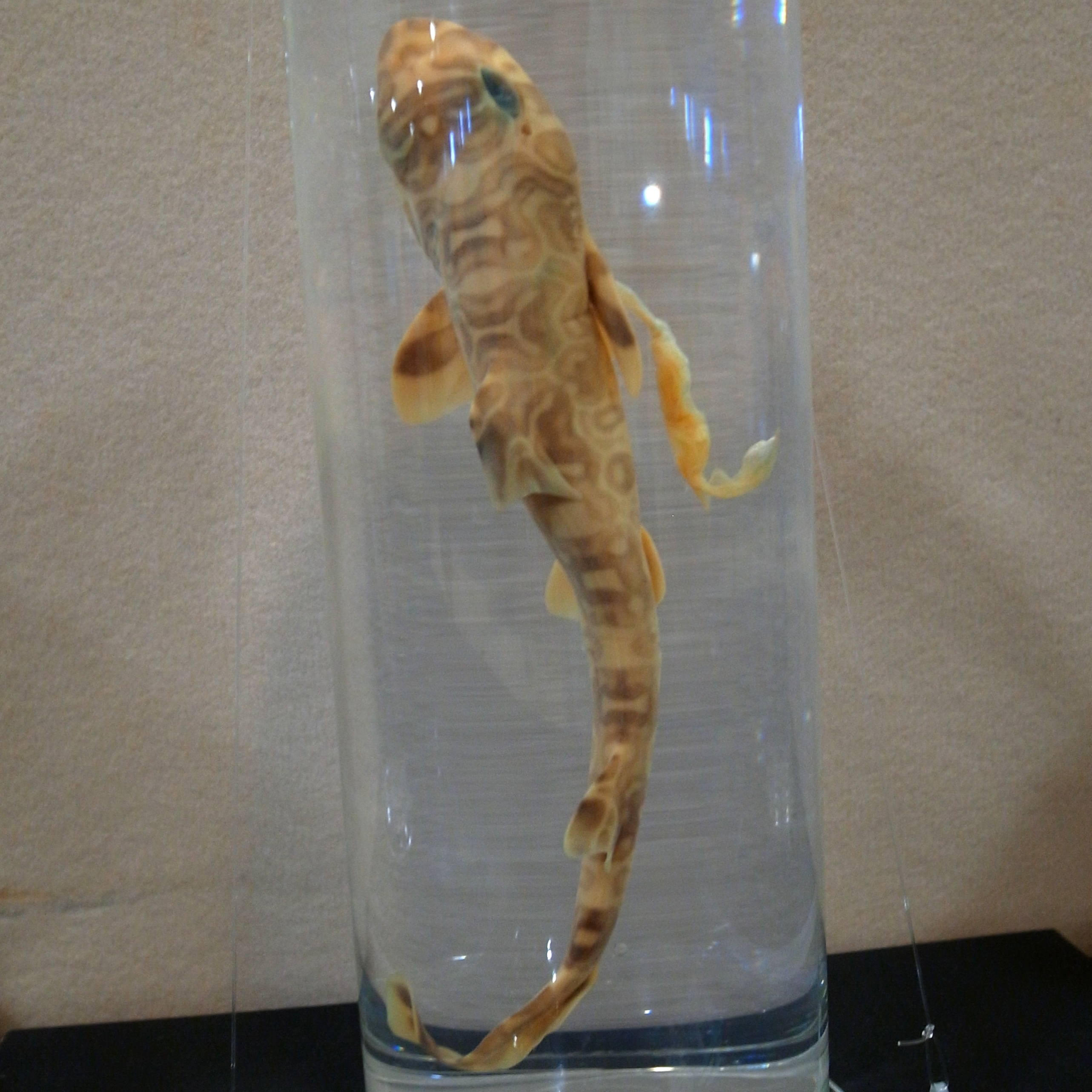

Conservation status
- Vulnerable (IUCN 3.1)

Scientific classification
- Kingdom: Animalia
- Phylum: Chordata
- Class: Chondrichthyes
- Subclass: Elasmobranchii
- Division: Selachii
- Order: Carcharhiniformes
- Family: Triakidae
- Genus: Hemitriakis
- Species: H. complicofasciata

Binomial name
- Hemitriakis complicofasciata T. Takahashi & Nakaya, 2004

= Ocellate topeshark =

Species of shark

The ocellate topeshark (Hemitriakis complicofasciata) is a species of houndshark, belonging to the family Triakidae. It is found in the western Pacific from the Ryukyu Islands to the Philippines and Taiwan.
