= Peppered catshark =

Conservation status
- Least Concern (IUCN 3.1)

Scientific classification
- Kingdom: Animalia
- Phylum: Chordata
- Class: Chondrichthyes
- Subclass: Elasmobranchii
- Division: Selachii
- Order: Carcharhiniformes
- Family: Pentanchidae
- Genus: Galeus
- Species: G. piperatus

Binomial name
- Galeus piperatus S. Springer & Wagner, 1966
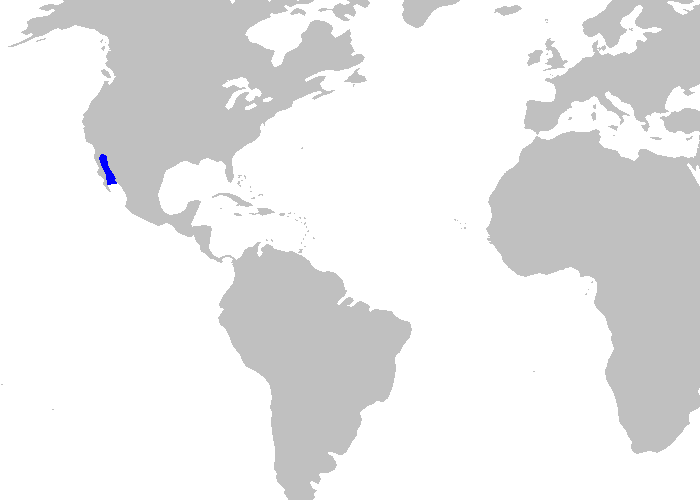
- Range of the peppered catshark

Species of shark

The peppered catshark (Galeus piperatus) is a common but little-known species of shark belonging to the family Pentanchidae, the deepwater catsharks. This species inhabits depths of 130–1,326 m (427–4,350 ft) in the northern Gulf of California. It is found on or near the ocean floor, and conducts seasonal migrations, spending winter in deeper water. Reaching a length of 37 cm (15 in), this species has a slender grayish body with a fine covering of black dots. On the dorsal edge of its caudal fin is a prominent crest of enlarged dermal denticles. It is oviparous, with the reproductive period probably lasting from May to September. The International Union for Conservation of Nature (IUCN) has listed the peppered catshark under Least Concern, as it faces no significant threats from human activity.

== Taxonomy ==
The peppered catshark was described by Stewart Springer and Mary Wagner in a 1966 issue of Los Angeles County Museum Contributions in Science; the specific epithet piperatus is derived from the Latin piper, meaning "pepper". The type specimen is an adult female 30 cm (12 in) long, collected halfway between Tiburón Island and Isla Ángel de la Guarda. The peppered catshark is barely distinguishable from the G. arae species complex of the western Atlantic; its anomalous geographical distribution is likely a product of vicariance stemming from the formation of the Isthmus of Panama (c. 3 Ma).

== Distribution and habitat ==
The range of the peppered catshark is limited to the Gulf of California, with the southern boundary defined by the city of Guaymas in Sonora, and Isla Salsipuedes in Baja California. This abundant species has been recorded from between 130 and 1,326 m (427 and 4,350 ft) deep, but is most common at a depth of 170–420 m (560–1,380 ft). Though main demersal in habits, at night it has been captured as much as 100 m (330 ft) above the bottom. At the northern extreme of the Gulf of California, this species virtually disappears during the summer, suggesting that it overwinters in deeper, more southerly waters. This migration is unusual in that it is opposite pattern observed in most other migratory fishes of the Gulf, and seems to be correlated with reproductive activity with spawning taking place in the summer.

== Description ==
The maximum known length attained by the peppered catshark is 37 cm (15 in). This species is slender and firm-bodied, with a slightly flattened head and a rather long, pointed snout. The anterior rims of the nostrils are expanded into triangular flaps of skin. The horizontally oval eyes are equipped with rudimentary nictitating membranes (protective third eyelids), and lack obvious ridges underneath. Behind each eye is a minute spiracle. The large mouth is wide and curved, with well-developed furrows at the corners. The teeth have narrow central cusps flanked by up to three pairs of cusplets on either side. There are five pairs of gill slits.

The first and second dorsal fins originate over the rear of the pelvic fins and the middle of the anal fin respectively. The dorsal fins are similar in shape and size, both having blunt apexes. The pectoral fins are large and broad, with rounded corners. The pelvic and anal fins are rather small and low, with angular corners. The anal fin base measures around 11–13% of the total length, comparable to the distance between the dorsal fins and greatly exceeding the distance between the pelvic and anal fins. The caudal peduncle is compressed from side to side and leads to a low caudal fin, which has a small lower lobe and a ventral notch near the tip of the upper lobe. The dermal denticles are small and overlapping, each with a leaf-shaped crown bearing a median ridge and three marginal teeth. There is a saw-like crest of enlarged denticles along the anterior portion of the upper caudal fin margin. The body and tail are dusky with a covering of fine black dots; young sharks may also have a series of darker brown saddle markings outlined in white. The caudal fin margin is white, and the inside of the mouth is typically blackish.

== Biology and ecology ==
Little is known of the natural history of the peppered catshark. Reproduction is oviparous and apparently takes place between May and September. Newly mature females carry only 2–3 eggs, while the largest females may carry 10 or more eggs at a time; each egg is contained within a distinctively olive-green capsule around 3.5 cm (1.4 in) long. The egg cases are consumed by the Pacific angelshark (Squatina california). The young sharks hatch at a length of 7–8 cm (2.8–3.1 in). Mathews (1984) reported females maturing at a length of 18 cm (7.1 in), while Compagno (1984) reported males and females maturing at lengths of 28–29 cm (11–11 in) and 26–30 cm (10–12 in) respectively.

== Human interactions ==
The peppered catshark generally lives beyond the depths utilized by commercial fisheries in the Gulf of California. As a result, the International Union for Conservation of Nature (IUCN) has assessed it as of Least Concern.
