= Springer's sawtail catshark =

Conservation status
- Least Concern (IUCN 3.1)

Scientific classification
- Kingdom: Animalia
- Phylum: Chordata
- Class: Chondrichthyes
- Subclass: Elasmobranchii
- Division: Selachii
- Order: Carcharhiniformes
- Family: Pentanchidae
- Genus: Galeus
- Species: G. springeri

Binomial name
- Galeus springeri Konstantinou & Cozzi, 1998
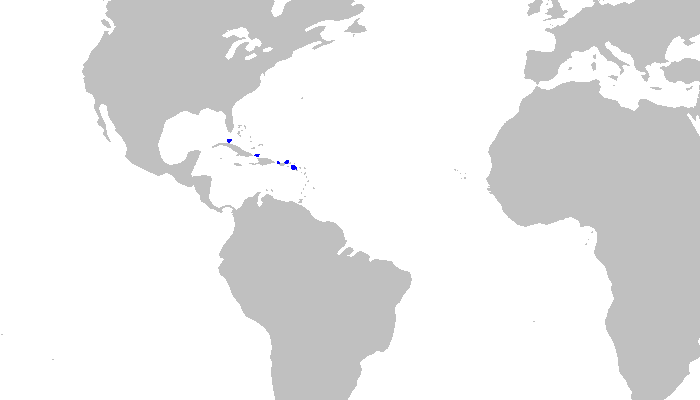
- Range of the Springer's sawtail catshark

Species of shark

Springer's sawtail catshark (Galeus springeri) is a species of shark belonging to the family Pentanchidae, the deepwater catsharks. This shark is found in waters 457–699 m (1,499–2,293 ft) deep off the islands of the Antilles, from Cuba to the Leewards. A small, slim-bodied species reaching a length of 48 cm (19 in), the Springer's sawtail catshark can be identified by its color pattern of horizontal dark stripes in front of the first dorsal fin, and dark dorsal saddles behind. It is additionally characterized by the presence of saw-toothed crests, made of enlarged dermal denticles along both the dorsal and the ventral edges of the caudal fin. The Springer's sawtail catshark is oviparous.

== Taxonomy ==
The Springer's sawtail catshark was originally regarded as the striped color morph of the Antilles catshark (G. antillensis, formerly G. arae antillensis). The first known specimen had resided in the National Museum of Natural History for over 20 years, until an artifact of preservation revealed the distinctive ventral dermal denticle crest on the caudal fin. The species was described in a 1998 issue of the scientific journal Copeia by Hera Konstantinou and Joseph Cozzi, who named it after leading shark taxonomist Stewart Springer. The type specimen is a 32 cm (13 in) long immature male collected on December 8, 1969 near the Leeward Islands. This shark belongs to the G. arae species complex, which also includes G. antillensis, G. arae, G. cadenati, and G. mincaronei.

== Distribution and habitat ==
The range of the Springer's sawtail catshark is limited and overlaps that of the similar Antilles catshark; it occurs off Cuba, Jamaica, Hispaniola, Puerto Rico, the Leeward Islands, and probably the U.S. Virgin Islands. The full extent of its distribution is uncertain due to confusion with related species. Recorded from depths of 457 to 699 m (1,499 to 2,293 ft), this species is found on or near the bottom over upper continental and insular slopes.

== Description ==
The largest known specimen of the Springer's sawtail catshark measured 48 cm (19 in) long. It has a slender body and a somewhat flattened head with a long, pointed snout. The eyes are horizontally oval and equipped with rudimentary nictitating membranes (protective third eyelids); they are followed by tiny spiracles and lack prominent ridges underneath. The nostrils are divided by triangular flaps of skin on their anterior rims. The large mouth forms a wide arch, and bears moderately long furrows at the corners. The teeth are small and have a narrow central cusp flanked by multiple cusplets; they are similar in both jaws, and between sexes. There are five pairs of gill slits.

The first dorsal fin has a blunt apex and is placed over the aft part of the pelvic fins. The second dorsal fin is similar in shape and nearly equal in size to the first, and placed over the aft part of the anal fin. The pectoral fins are fairly large and broad. The small pelvic fins are low relative to their bases, and have angular margins. The anal fin is elongated and placed close to the pelvic and caudal fins; the anal fin base measures 11% of the total length, about comparable to the space between the dorsal fins. The caudal fin has a small lower lobe and a ventral notch near the tip of the upper lobe. The body is covered by small, overlapping dermal denticles, each with a teardrop-shaped crown with a median ridge and three marginal teeth. There are enlarged denticles forming distinctive saw-like crests along the anterior portions of both the dorsal and ventral caudal fin edges. This species has a unique dorsal color pattern, consisting of dark horizontal stripes outlined in white in front of the dorsal fins, and a series of dark saddle-like markings running from the first dorsal fin base to the tail, on a dusky background. The underside is uniformly white.

== Biology and ecology ==
There is little known of the natural history of the Springer's sawtail catshark. Reproduction is presumably oviparous; other females of the G. arae complex produce flask-shaped egg capsules around 5 cm (2.0 in) long, with tendrils at the upper two corners. Adult males have yet to be captured; the largest immature male measured 32 cm (13 in) long. Females are mature by a length of 43 cm (17 in).

== Human interactions ==
The International Union for Conservation of Nature has listed the Springer's sawtail catshark as least concern. Given its restricted range, it may be negatively affected by any expansion of deepwater fisheries in the region. It is occasionally caught in bottom trawls.
