= Dwarf sawtail catshark =

Conservation status
- Least Concern (IUCN 3.1)

Scientific classification
- Kingdom: Animalia
- Phylum: Chordata
- Class: Chondrichthyes
- Subclass: Elasmobranchii
- Division: Selachii
- Order: Carcharhiniformes
- Family: Pentanchidae
- Genus: Galeus
- Species: G. schultzi

Binomial name
- Galeus schultzi S. Springer, 1979
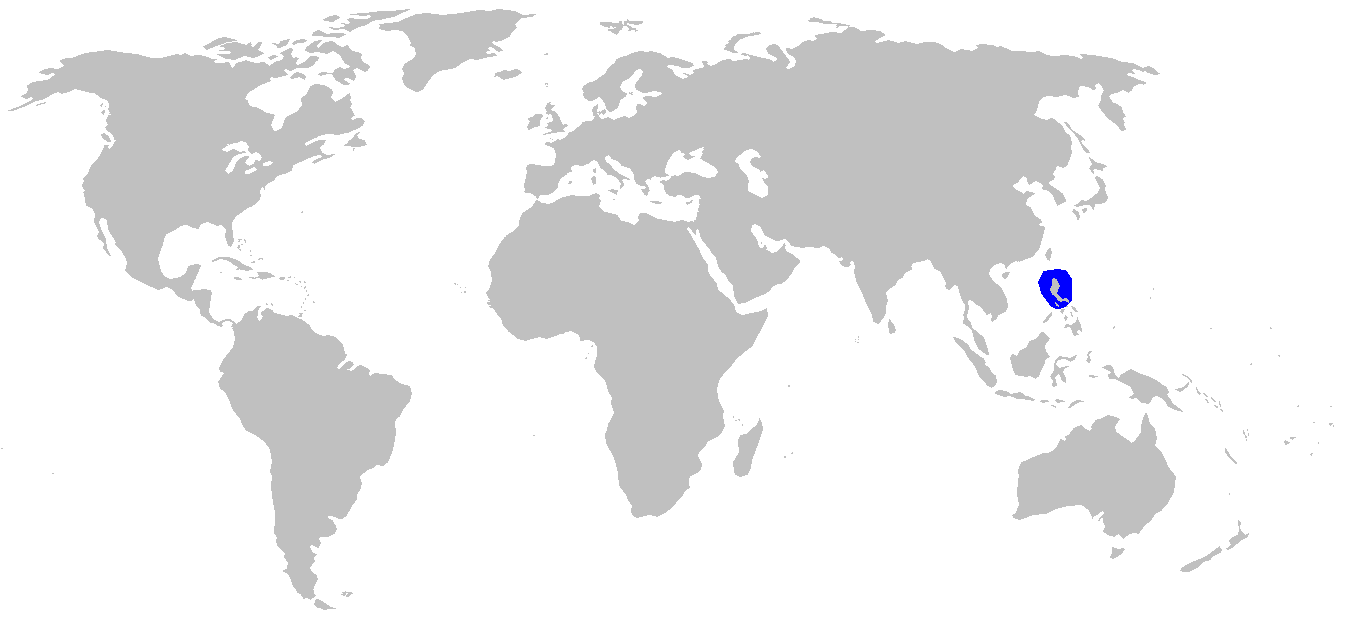
- Range of the dwarf sawtail catshark

Species of shark

The dwarf sawtail catshark (Galeus schultzi) is a species of shark belonging to the family Pentanchidae, the deepwater catsharks. This shark is found exclusively in the deep waters off Luzon in the Philippines. Unlike other members of its genus, this slender, diminutive shark has a short, rounded snout and very short furrows at the corners of its jaws. It has indistinct darker saddles beneath each dorsal fin and two dark bands on the caudal fin, as well as a prominent crest of enlarged dermal denticles along the upper caudal fin margin.

== Taxonomy ==
Renowned shark expert Stewart Springer described the dwarf sawtail catshark in a 1979 National Oceanic and Atmospheric Administration (NOAA) Technical Report. The type specimen is an adult male 30 cm (12 in) long, collected from Balayan Bay. It does not closely resemble more typical Galeus species, and its placement within the genus is not concrete.

== Distribution and habitat ==
The dwarf sawtail catshark is endemic to Luzon in the Philippines. It is found on or near the bottom over the upper continental slope at a depth of 329–431 m (1,079–1,414 ft), barring a single record from a depth of 50 m (160 ft) on the outer continental shelf.

== Description ==
Reaching a length of 30 cm (12 in), the dwarf sawtail catshark has a slim, firm body and a distinctively short, rounded snout. The nostrils are divided by triangular flaps of skin on their anterior rims. The horizontally oval eyes are placed somewhat high on the head, and equipped with rudimentary nictitating membranes (protective third eyelids). There are low ridges beneath the eyes, and tiny spiracles behind them. The large, wide, arched mouth bears very short furrows at the corners. There are 48 tooth rows in the upper jaw, and fewer in the lower jaw; each tooth has a narrow central cusp flanked by lateral cusplets. There are five pairs of gill slits.

The two dorsal fins have rounded apexes and are similar in size; the first originates over the aft portion of the pelvic fins, and the second over the aft portion of the anal fin. The pectoral fins are large and wide. The pelvic and anal fins are short and low, with angular corners. The base of the anal fin measures 10–11% of the total length, longer than the distances between either the dorsal fins or the pelvic and anal fins. The caudal peduncle is nearly cylindrical and leads to a low caudal fin with an indistinct lower lobe and a ventral notch near the tip of the upper lobe. The small, overlapping dermal denticles each have a leaf-shaped crown with a median ridge and three teeth on the posterior margin. A crest of enlarged denticles is present along the dorsal caudal fin margin. This species is brownish above and lighter below, with a faint darker saddle beneath each dorsal fin, and two darker bands on the caudal fin. The interior of the mouth varies from light to dusky.

== Biology and ecology ==
The natural history of the dwarf sawtail catshark is poorly known. Males attain sexual maturity at around 25 cm (9.8 in) long, and females at 27–30 cm (11–12 in) long.

== Human interactions ==
Only a few specimens of the dwarf sawtail catshark have been collected. The International Union for Conservation of Nature (IUCN) to list this species as least concern. The depth range it occupies is not known to be utilized by commercial trawl fisheries.
