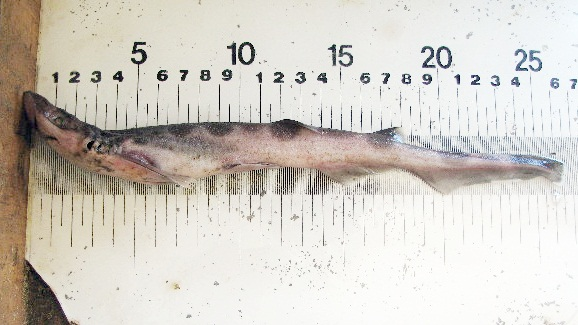

Conservation status
- Vulnerable (IUCN 3.1)

Scientific classification
- Kingdom: Animalia
- Phylum: Chordata
- Class: Chondrichthyes
- Subclass: Elasmobranchii
- Division: Selachii
- Order: Carcharhiniformes
- Family: Pentanchidae
- Genus: Galeus
- Species: G. polli

Binomial name
- Galeus polli Cadenat, 1959
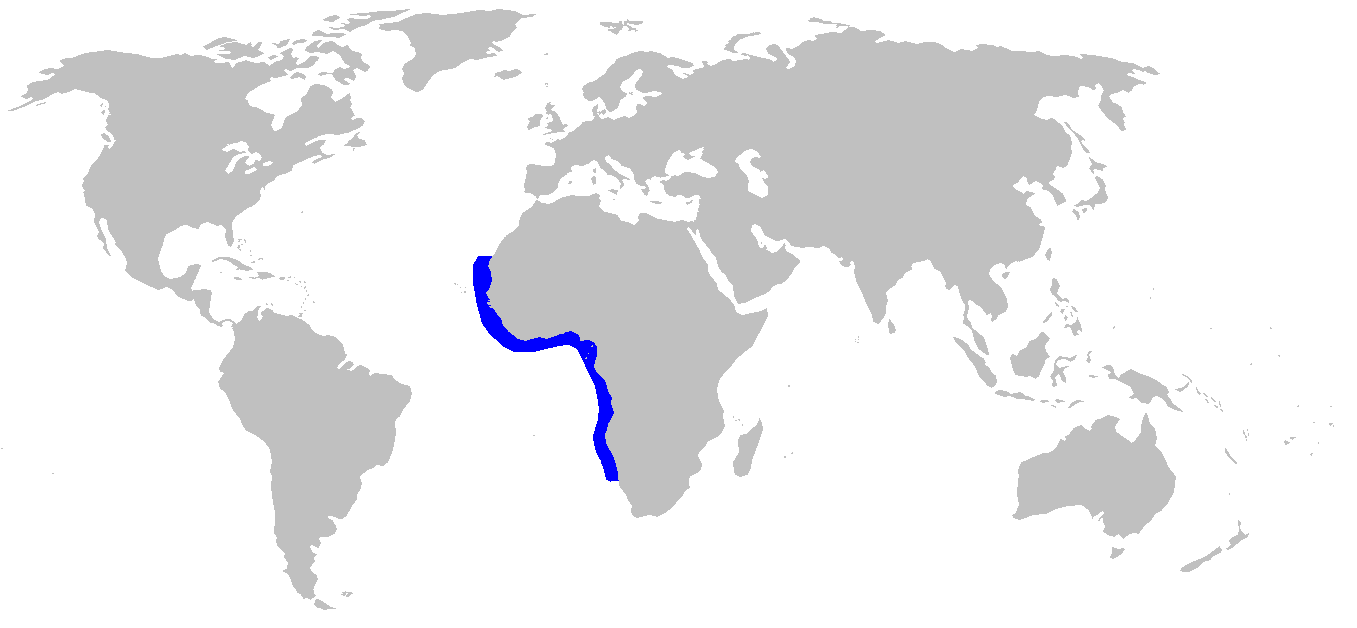
- Range of the African sawtail catshark

= African sawtail catshark =

Species of shark

The African sawtail catshark (Galeus polli) is a species of shark belonging to the family Pentanchidae, the deepwater catsharks. Demersal in nature, it is found at depths of 160–720 m (520–2,360 ft) off the western African coast from Morocco to South Africa. This slender species has a rather long, pointed snout, a series of dark saddles along the back and tail, and a prominent crest of enlarged dermal denticles along the upper edge of the caudal fin. Its maximum known length is 46 cm (18 in).

The diet of the African sawtail catshark consists of small bony fishes, squid, and crustaceans. It is the only member of its genus known to be aplacental viviparous; reproduction proceeds year-round, with females bear litters of up to 12 pups. In relatively shallower waters, this shark is caught incidentally and utilized for meat or fishmeal. The fisheries off Namibia, where it is most abundant, are well-managed and do not threaten its population. Given also that sharks in deeper waters are not significantly fished, the International Union for Conservation of Nature (IUCN) has assessed this species as Vulnerable.

== Taxonomy ==
In 1953, Belgian ichthyologist Max Poll published a report on sharks and chimaeras captured during a 1948–49 Belgian oceanographic expedition off western Africa, including several seemingly ovoviviparous blackmouth catsharks (G. melastomus). As the blackmouth catshark is known to be oviparous, Poll's account alerted French zoologist Jean Cadenat to the presence of a distinct catshark species in the region. After examining more specimens from Senegal, Cadenat described the new species in a 1959 issue of the scientific journal Bulletin de l'Institut Français d'Afrique Noire (Série A) Sciences Naturelles, naming it in Poll's honor.

== Distribution and habitat ==
The African sawtail catshark is found along much of the western coast of Africa, from southern Morocco to the Northern Cape Province of South Africa. It is known to be abundant off Namibia and rare south of the Orange River. This species inhabits the outer continental shelf and upper continental slope between the depths of 160 and 720 m (520 and 2,360 ft), and is most common at depths of 258–490 m (846–1,608 ft). Found on or near the bottom, this shark can tolerate water with low levels of dissolved oxygen.

== Description ==
The African sawtail catshark attains a maximum known length of 46 cm (18 in); females tend to be larger than males. It has a slender, firm body and a slightly flattened head with a long, pointed snout. The anterior rim of each nostril bears a triangular flap of skin. The eyes are horizontally oval, equipped with rudimentary nictitating membranes (protective third eyelids), and lack strong ridges underneath. Tiny spiracles are located behind the eyes. The mouth is large, wide, and arched, with well-developed furrows at the corners. The teeth have a central cusp and 1–2 pairs of smaller lateral cusplets. There are five pairs of gill slits.

The two dorsal fins are blunt-tipped and similar in size; the first is positioned over the rear of the pelvic fins and the second over the rear of the anal fin. The pectoral fins are large and broad with rounded corners, while the pelvic and anal fins are elongated and more angular. The anal fin base is close to the pelvic and caudal fins and measures 14–17% of the total length, much greater than the distance between the dorsal fins. The caudal peduncle is compressed from side to side and leads to a low caudal fin with a small lower lobe and a ventral notch near the tip of the upper lobe. The dermal denticles are small and overlapping, each with three-toothed crown that bears a median ridge. There is a crest of enlarged saw-like denticles along the dorsal edge of the caudal fin. This species is dusky above and light below. There are typically 11 or fewer dark gray or brown saddles and/or blotches outlined in white along the back and tail. The pattern tends to fade with age, and some individuals are uniformly colored. The interior of the mouth is black.

== Biology and ecology ==
Small bony fishes, including lanternfishes, hakes, grenadiers, rockfishes and lightfishes, comprise the bulk of the African sawtail catshark's diet. Squid and crustaceans may also be consumed. A known predator of this species is the southern African frilled shark (Chlamydoselachus africana). Unlike other members of its genus, the African sawtail catshark is aplacental viviparous, with females retaining eggs internally until they hatch. There is apparently no defined breeding season, and mating and birthing occur throughout the year. Adult females have two functional uteruses and produce litters of up to 12 young; litter size increases with female size. The developing embryos are initially sustained an external yolk sac, and emerge from the egg at between 2.4 and 2.8 cm (0.94 and 1.10 in) long. Pigmentation begins to develop at an embryonic length of 5 cm (2.0 in). At around 6 cm (2.4 in) long, the embryos have well-developed external gills, which largely disappear by the time they are 10 cm (3.9 in) long. Near-term fetuses weigh over twice as much as eggs, suggesting some form of secondary maternal provisioning during gestation. The newborns measure 10–18 cm (3.9–7.1 in) long. Males and females reach sexual maturity at 30–46 cm (12–18 in) and 30–43 cm (12–17 in) long respectively.

== Human interactions ==
There is intensive fishing activity in the shallower portions of the African sawtail catshark's distribution, where it is caught incidentally in bottom trawls. Landed sharks may be marketed for human consumption or processed into fishmeal. Because this species is largely protected from fishing pressure in deeper water, and the Namibian fisheries operating at its center of abundance are well-regulated, the International Union for Conservation of Nature (IUCN) has listed it as Vulnerable.
