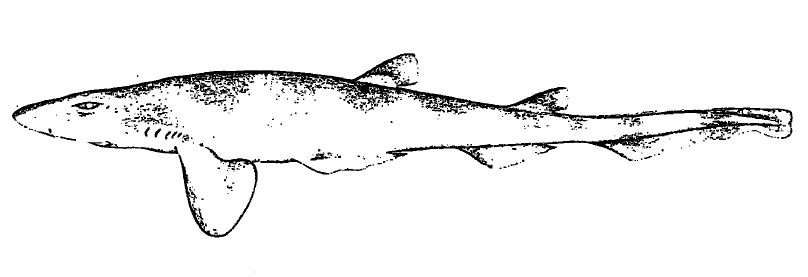

Conservation status
- Least Concern (IUCN 3.1)

Scientific classification
- Kingdom: Animalia
- Phylum: Chordata
- Class: Chondrichthyes
- Subclass: Elasmobranchii
- Division: Selachii
- Order: Carcharhiniformes
- Family: Pentanchidae
- Genus: Galeus
- Species: G. antillensis

Binomial name
- Galeus antillensis S. Springer, 1979
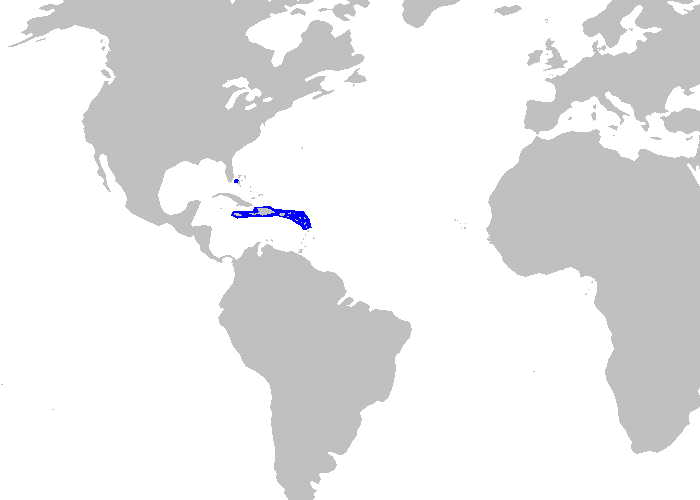
- Range of the Antilles catshark

= Antilles catshark =

Species of shark

The Antilles catshark (Galeus antillensis) is a common but little-known species of deepwater catshark, belonging of the family Pentanchidae. It is found on or near the bottom at a depth of 293–695 m (961–2,280 ft) off Florida and the West Indies from Jamaica to Martinique. It was once regarded as a subspecies of the similar roughtail catshark (G. arae), along with the longfin sawtail catshark (G. cadenati). Growing to 46 cm (18 in) long, the Antilles catshark is a slender species with a marbled color pattern of dark saddles and blotches, as well as a crest of enlarge dermal denticles along the front part of its dorsal caudal fin margin. It feeds on shrimp and may have schooling habits. Reproduction is oviparous.

== Taxonomy ==
Shark expert Stewart Springer first described the Antilles catshark as an island subspecies of G. arae in a 1979 National Oceanic and Atmospheric Administration (NOAA) Technical Report. The type specimen was collected off Saint Kitts in the Leeward Islands. In 1998 and 2000, Hera Konstantinou and colleagues published revisions of the G. arae species complex, wherein they elevated the subspecies G. a. antillensis and G. a. cadenati to full species, and described what had been considered the striped color morph of G. a. antillensis as a new species, G. springeri. The taxonomic distinction between this species and the recently described G. mincaronei of southern Brazil warrants further investigation.

== Distribution and habitat ==
The Antilles catshark has been reported from the Straits of Florida, as well as from the waters around Jamaica, Hispaniola, Puerto Rico, the Leeward Islands, and Martinique. Its range may be wider than is known and overlaps that of G. springeri, but not G. arae or G. cadenati. This abundant, demersal species inhabits continental and insular slopes, at a depth of 293–695 m (961–2,280 ft).

== Description ==
The Antilles catshark grows larger than G. arae and G. cadenati, reaching a maximum known length of 46 cm (18 in). Slim in build, it has a somewhat flattened head with a long, pointed snout. The horizontally oval eyes are equipped with rudimentary nictitating membranes (protective third eyelids), and are followed by tiny spiracles. There are no prominent ridges beneath the eyes. The nostrils are divided by triangular flaps of skin on their anterior rims. The mouth is short, wide, and curved, and bears rather long furrows at the corners. The teeth number around 56 upper and 52 lower rows; each tooth has a long central cusp flanked by one or two smaller cusplets on either side. There are five pairs of gill slits.

The apexes of two dorsal fins are blunt, with the first originating behind the midpoint of the pelvic fin bases. The second dorsal fin is almost as large as the first, and originates behind the midpoint of the anal fin base. The pectoral fins are rather large and broad, with rounded corners. The pelvic and anal fins are low and angular. The anal fin base measures roughly 8–14% of the total length, about comparable to the space between the dorsal fins. The caudal fin has a small lower lobe and a ventral notch near the tip of the upper lobe. The body is covered by tiny, overlapping dermal denticles; each has a leaf-shaped crown bearing a horizontal ridge and three marginal teeth. There is a prominent, saw-toothed crest formed from enlarged denticles along the anterior portion of the dorsal caudal fin edge. This species has a marbled color pattern consisting of usually fewer than 11 dark brown saddles and/or blotches along the back and tail, on a dusky background; the blotches can vary from faint to well-defined by a pale outline. Some individuals also have a distinctive dark marking with three backward-pointing prongs atop the head. The underside is plain and whitish. The inside of the mouth is dark.

== Biology and ecology ==
The Antilles catshark may form large schools, and feeds mainly on shrimp. It is oviparous; adult females have a single functional ovary, on the right, and two functional oviducts. A single egg matures inside each oviduct at a time. The egg is contained within a flask-shaped capsule measuring around 4.9–5.1 cm (1.9–2.0 in) long, 1.2–1.4 cm (0.47–0.55 in) across the top, and 1.6 cm (0.63 in) across the bottom; there are coiled tendrils at the upper two corners. Males and females attain sexual maturity at approximately 33–36 cm (13–14 in) and 34–46 cm (13–18 in) long respectively.

== Human interactions ==
The International Union for Conservation of Nature (IUCN) has listed the Antilles catshark under least concern. It is perhaps too small to be captured by some types of fishing gear, though its limited distribution means any increased fishing within its habitat may merit concern.
