= Phallic catshark =

Conservation status
- Least Concern (IUCN 3.1)

Scientific classification
- Kingdom: Animalia
- Phylum: Chordata
- Class: Chondrichthyes
- Subclass: Elasmobranchii
- Division: Selachii
- Order: Carcharhiniformes
- Family: Pentanchidae
- Genus: Galeus
- Species: G. priapus

Binomial name
- Galeus priapus Séret & Last, 2008

Species of shark

The phallic catshark (Galeus priapus) is a species of shark belonging to the family Pentanchidae, the deepwater catsharks. It is found on or near the ocean floor, in the deep waters off New Caledonia and Vanuatu. A slender species attaining a length of 46 cm (18 in), it is characterized by a long caudal fin bearing a crest of enlarged dermal denticles along the dorsal margin, and very long claspers in adult males. This shark is gray-colored, with four dark saddles along the back and tail.

== Taxonomy ==
The first specimens of G. priapus were collected in the 1990s, during a series of Indo-Pacific research cruises jointly undertaken by the Institut de recherche pour le développement (IRD) and the Muséum national d'histoire naturelle (MNHN). Bernard Séret and Peter Last described the new species in a 2008 volume of the scientific journal Zootaxa. It was given the specific epithet priapus after the Greek fertility god Priapos, in reference to the distinctively long claspers of males. The type specimen is a 39 cm (15 in) long adult male trawled by the RV Alis off New Caledonia on March 30, 1994. Within the genus, this species most closely resembles the slender sawtail catshark (G. gracilis).

== Distribution and habitat ==
Galeus priapus is a demersal species that has been recorded from a depth of 620–830 m (2,030–2,720 ft) on the slopes of seamounts and submarine ridges off New Caledonia, between the Loyalty Islands and the Norfolk Ridge, as well as from a depth of 262–352 m (860–1,155 ft) off Espiritu Santo Island in Vanuatu.

== Description ==
Galeus priapus is a firm-bodied, very slim shark that reaches at least 46 cm (18 in) in length. The head has a long, narrow parabolic shape from above. The small, horizontal eyes are placed rather high on the head, and equipped with rudimentary nictitating membranes (protective third eyelids). Beneath each eye is a prominent ridge, and behind is a tiny spiracle. The anterior rims of the nostrils bear triangular flaps of skin. The mouth is fairly large and wide, and is broadly arched. There are long, well-developed furrows that wrap around each corner of the mouth. The tooth rows number around 60 in either jaw; the teeth have a narrow central cusp flanked by 1–2 pairs of smaller cusplets. There are five pairs of gill slits.

The dorsal fins vary in shape, with the first is marginally larger than the second. The first dorsal fin originates over the posterior half of the pelvic fins, while the second originates over the middle of the anal fin. The pectoral fins are fairly large and wide, with rounded tips. The pelvic fins are short and low; adult males have characteristically long, thin claspers measuring roughly 10–11% of the total length. The anal fin is relatively small, with its base measuring 8–10% of the total length. The caudal fin is long, with a small lower lobe and a deep ventral notch near the tip of the upper lobe. The dermal denticles are small and overlapping, each with a median ridge and three marginal teeth on the crown. An elevated, saw-like crest of enlarged denticles is present along the front half of the dorsal caudal fin edge. This species is a variable shade of gray above, with a dark saddle intersecting the front half of each dorsal fin, and two more saddles along the tail. The leading margins of the pectoral fins are distinctly black, while the trailing margins of the dorsal and anal fins are whitish. The underside is pale and unmarked. The interior lining of the mouth is blackish on the roof and white elsewhere.

== Biology and ecology ==
Little is known of the natural history of G. priapus. Males attain sexual maturity at around 39 cm (15 in) long.

== Human interactions ==
G. priapus has been evaluated as Least Concern by the International Union for Conservation of Nature (IUCN).
