= Southern sawtail catshark =

Conservation status
- Vulnerable (IUCN 3.1)

Scientific classification
- Kingdom: Animalia
- Phylum: Chordata
- Class: Chondrichthyes
- Subclass: Elasmobranchii
- Division: Selachii
- Order: Carcharhiniformes
- Family: Pentanchidae
- Genus: Galeus
- Species: G. mincaronei

Binomial name
- Galeus mincaronei Soto, 2001
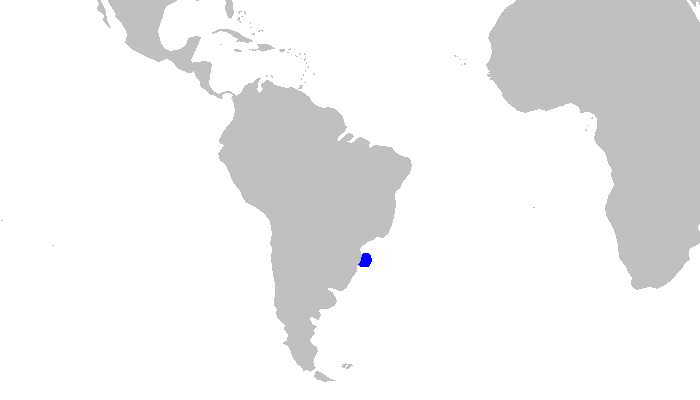
- Range of the southern sawtail catshark

Species of shark

The southern sawtail catshark (Galeus mincaronei) is a species of deepwater catshark, belonging to the family Pentanchidae, endemic to southern Brazil. It inhabits deepwater reefs on the upper continental slope at a depth of 236–600 m (774–1,969 ft). Reaching at least 43 cm (17 in) in length, this slim-bodied species closely resembles the Antilles catshark (G. antillensis). It has a prominent crest of enlarged dermal denticles along the dorsal edge of the caudal fin, as well as a distinctive color pattern of dark oval blotches, outlined in white, along its back. The southern sawtail catshark is oviparous, with females producing reddish egg capsules. The International Union for Conservation of Nature (IUCN) has assessed it as Vulnerable; it is often taken as bycatch and may be threatened by intensifying squid fishing.

== Taxonomy ==
The first known specimens of the southern sawtail catshark were caught in a series of experimental fish traps set off Rio Grande do Sul, Brazil, in 1988. Initially identified as Galeus antillensis, the species was described in a 2001 issue of the scientific journal Mare Magnum by Jules Soto, who named it after Michael Maia Mincarone for his contributions to the Museu Oceanográfico do Vale do Itajaí. The type specimen is an adult male 40 cm (16 in) long.

The southern sawtail catshark closely resembles G. antillensis, and with it belongs to the G. arae species complex along with G. arae, G. cadenati, and G. springeri. In 2006, Getulio Rincon and Carolus Vooren reported that the range of morphometric variation in this species was greater than previously thought, casting doubt on the characters originally used to distinguish it from G. antillensis, such as the length of the pectoral fin margins. They recommended further study to resolve the status of the two species.

== Distribution and habitat ==
The only Galeus species in the southwestern Atlantic, the southern sawtail catshark is found off the southern Brazilian states of Rio Grande do Sul and Santa Catarina, and may occur as far north as São Paulo. Its total range is estimated to encompass less than 20,000 km^{2} (7,700 sq mi) of area. This species has been recorded from between the depths of 236 and 600 m (774 and 1,969 ft), but is most common below 400 m (1,300 ft). Demersal in nature, it favors deepwater reefs on the upper continental shelf, that are rich in sea fans, hard corals, sponges, crinoids, and brittle stars.

== Description ==
The largest known specimen of the southern sawtail catshark measured 43 cm (17 in) long. This species has a slender body and a moderately short, flattened head with a pointed snout. The eyes are horizontally oval and have rudimentary nictitating membranes (protective third eyelids); they are followed by tiny spiracles. The ridge beneath each eye is indistinct. The anterior rims of the nostrils are enlarged into triangular skin flaps. The large mouth forms a short, wide arch, with fairly long, deep furrows around the corners; males have a slightly longer, narrower mouth and larger teeth than females. There are around 57–71 upper tooth rows and 56–63 lower tooth rows. Each tooth has a narrow central cusp flanked by one or two smaller cusplets on either side. There are five pairs of gill slits, with the fourth and fifth over the pectoral fin bases.

The first dorsal fin originates over the rear of the pelvic fins, while the second dorsal fin originates over the rear of the anal fin. Both dorsal fins are small with rounded apexes; the first is slightly smaller than the second. The pectoral fins are fairly large, with rounded corners. The pelvic fins are small and relatively broad; adult males have rather short, thick claspers that bear hooks on their inner surfaces. The anal fin base measures between 11 and 14% of the total length, exceeding the distance between the pelvic and anal fins and ranging from longer to shorter than the distance between the dorsal fins. The caudal fin is short, with a small lower lobe and a ventral notch near the tip of the upper lobe. The body is covered by small, overlapping dermal denticles, each has a crown bearing a horizontal ridge and three teeth on the posterior margin. A saw-like crest of enlarged denticles is present along the anterior half of the caudal fin dorsal edge. The dorsal coloration is reddish brown with a series of large oval blotches along either side of the back. The blotches are darker and outlined in white, and become less distinct towards the tail. The fins are dark, with or without lighter margins, and the underside is off-white. The inside of the mouth is blackish.

== Biology and ecology ==
The southern sawtail catshark shares its habitat with the abundant freckled catshark (Scyliorhinus haeckelii). Reproduction is oviparous. Adult females have a single functional ovary, on the right, and two functional oviducts; a single egg matures within an oviduct at a time. The egg is enclosed in a reddish vase-shaped capsule, measuring roughly 5–6 cm (2.0–2.4 in) long and 4 cm (1.6 in) wide. with coiled tendrils at the four corners. Males and females reach sexual maturity at 36–38 cm (14–15 in) and 35–39 cm (14–15 in) long respectively.

== Human interactions ==
Significant, though unquantified, numbers of southern sawtail catsharks are caught incidentally on bottom longlines and in bottom trawls and traps, deployed by goosefish and squid fisheries. Given its very limited range, its population may be threatened by increasing levels of squid fishing activity. The International Union for Conservation of Nature (IUCN) has therefore assessed this species as Vulnerable.
