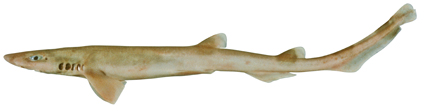

Conservation status
- Data Deficient (IUCN 3.1)

Scientific classification
- Kingdom: Animalia
- Phylum: Chordata
- Class: Chondrichthyes
- Subclass: Elasmobranchii
- Division: Selachii
- Order: Carcharhiniformes
- Family: Pentanchidae
- Genus: Galeus
- Species: G. gracilis

Binomial name
- Galeus gracilis Compagno & Stevens, 1993
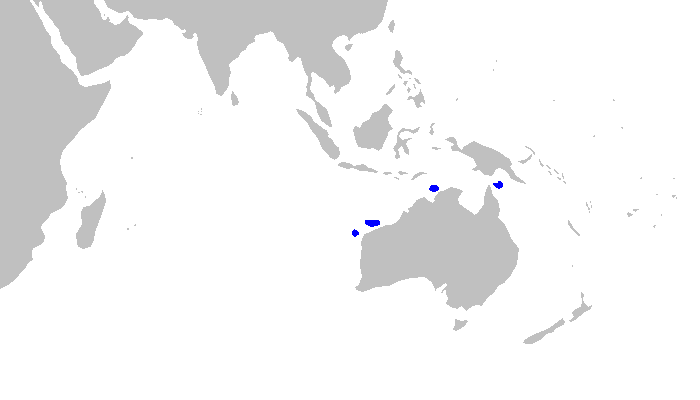
- Range of the slender sawtail catshark

= Slender sawtail catshark =

Species of shark

The slender sawtail catshark (Galeus gracilis) is a little-known species of deepwater catshark, part of the family Pentanchidae, endemic to northern Australia. It is found over the continental slope in 290–470 m (950–1,540 ft) on water. Growing to 34 cm (13 in) long, this shark has a slim gray body with four dark saddle markings below the dorsal fins and on the caudal fin, as well as a prominent crest of enlarged dermal denticles along the dorsal edge of the caudal fin. The slender sawtail catshark is not valued by fisheries but is taken as bycatch. The International Union for Conservation of Nature (IUCN) presently lacks enough information to assess its conservation status.

== Taxonomy and phylogeny ==
Leonard Compagno and John Stevens described the slender sawtail catshark in a 1993 issue of the scientific journal Records of the Australian Museum. They gave it the specific epithet gracilis, meaning "slender" in Latin; previously, the species had been provisionally termed Galeus sp. A. The type specimen is a 34 cm (13 in) long adult female, caught in January 1988 north of Melville Island, Northern Territory. Within the genus, G. gracilis appears to be closely related to G. eastmani, G. longirostris, and G. nipponensis. A 2005 phylogenetic analysis, based on mitochondrial and nuclear DNA, reported that this species, G. eastmani, and G. sauteri formed a clade apart from G. melastomus and G. murinus.

== Description ==
A small species growing to at least 34 cm (13 in) long, the slender sawtail catshark has a slim body with a nearly cylindrical cross-section, and a short, narrow head with a rounded snout. The eyes are horizontally oval and equipped with rudimentary nictitating membranes (protective third eyelids). Below each eye is a thin ridge, and behind is a tiny spiracle. The nostrils are divided by small, triangular flaps of skin in front. The mouth forms a wide arch and bears moderately long furrows around the corners. The teeth are small and closely set, numbering 54–57 rows in the upper jaw and 54–62 rows in the lower jaw. Each tooth has a narrow central cusp usually flanked by one, occasionally two small cusplets on either side. The teeth of males are slightly larger and longer than those of females. There are five pairs of gill slits, with the fourth and fifth pairs over the pectoral fin bases.

The first dorsal fin slightly exceeds the second in size and originates over the midpoint of the pelvic fin bases. The second dorsal fin is positioned over the last third of the anal fin. The dorsal fins have rounded apexes. The short, wide pectoral fins are roughly triangular, with rounded corners. The pelvic and anal fins are long-based, low, and fairly angular. Adult males have long, tapering claspers, each with saw-like rows of denticles along the inner surface, and twisted tips. The anal fin base measures around 11% of the total length and exceeds or matches the distances between the anal fin and the pelvic and caudal fins. The caudal fin is narrow, with a small but distinct lower lobe and a ventral notch near the tip of the upper lobe. The body and fins are densely covered by tiny, overlapping dermal denticles. Each has a teardrop-shaped crown covered by small pits, and bears a central ridge and typically three marginal teeth. There is a crest of enlarged denticles along the front portion of the caudal fin dorsal margin. This species is light gray above and lighter below; there is a small, dark saddle below each dorsal fin base, as well as two more saddles on the caudal fin, the second of which almost forms a complete ring. Some sharks also have a faint darker blotch over each flank. The inner lining of the mouth is dark gray.

== Distribution and habitat ==
Apparently rare, the slender sawtail catshark has been collected from off Cape Cuvier and Port Hedland in Western Australia, off Melville Island off Northern Territory, and off Cape York in Queensland. It may also be present in eastern Indonesian waters. It is unknown whether these scattered records represent separate populations or a single continuous population. Demersal in nature, this shark inhabits the continental slope at a depth of 290–470 m (950–1,540 ft).

== Biology and ecology ==
Virtually nothing is known of the slender sawtail catshark's natural history. Males mature sexually at a length of 33 cm (13 in).

== Human interactions ==
Unknown numbers of slender sawtail catsharks are caught incidentally by the Western Trawl Fishery operating off northwestern Australia. There is no direct fishing for this species as it has no commercial value. Given a lack of information on conservation threats, the International Union for Conservation of Nature (IUCN) has listed this species as Data Deficient.
