= Broadfin sawtail catshark =

Conservation status
- Least Concern (IUCN 3.1)

Scientific classification
- Kingdom: Animalia
- Phylum: Chordata
- Class: Chondrichthyes
- Subclass: Elasmobranchii
- Division: Selachii
- Order: Carcharhiniformes
- Family: Pentanchidae
- Genus: Galeus
- Species: G. nipponensis

Binomial name
- Galeus nipponensis Nakaya, 1975
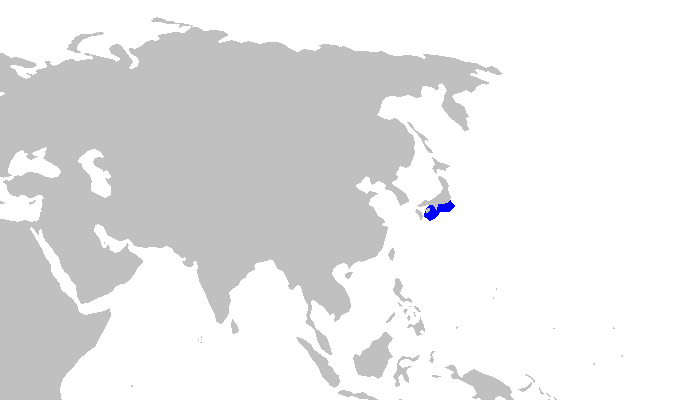
- Range of the broadfin sawtail catshark

Species of shark

The broadfin sawtail catshark (Galeus nipponensis) is a species of shark belonging to the family Pentanchidae, the deepwater catsharks. It is found on or near the bottom at depths of 150–540 m (490–1,770 ft), from southeastern Japan to the East China Sea. A slender species growing to 68 cm (27 in) long, this shark is characterized by a fairly long, pointed snout, a series of indistinct, dark saddles along its back and tail, and a prominent crest of enlarged dermal denticles along the dorsal edge of its caudal fin. In addition, adult males have very long claspers that reach past the anal fin. The broadfin sawtail catshark is an opportunistic predator of bony fishes, cephalopods, and crustaceans, with immature and mature sharks being primarily piscivorous. It is oviparous and reproduces year-round.

== Taxonomy ==
The broadfin sawtail catshark has long been lumped together with the closely similar but smaller gecko catshark (G. eastmani), under whose name authors such as Toshiji Kamohara had described it since 1950. This shark was formally described as a new species in a 1975 volume of the scientific journal Memoirs of the Faculty of Fisheries, Hokkaido University by Kazuhiro Nakaya, who gave it the specific epithet nipponensis from Nippon (Japan). The type specimen is a 60 cm (24 in) long adult male caught off Mimase in Kōchi Prefecture, on December 20, 1972. Within the genus, this species is closest in morphology to the longnose sawtail catshark (G. longirostris).

== Distribution and habitat ==
The broadfin sawtail catshark is found in the northwestern Pacific from Sagami Bay off southeastern Honshu, Japan to the East China Sea, including the Ryukyu Islands and the Kyushu–Palau Ridge. It is reportedly common in Japanese waters. This demersal species has been recorded from water between 150 and 540 m (490 and 1,770 ft) deep.

== Description ==
Attaining a maximum known length of 68 cm (27 in), the broadfin sawtail catshark has a slim, firm body and a head comprises less than one-fifth of the total length. The snout is rather long, flattened, and pointed, with large nostrils that bear triangular skin flaps on their anterior rims. The sizable eyes are horizontally oval and equipped with rudimentary nictitating membranes (protective third eyelids). Beneath each eye is a subtle ridge, and behind is a small spiracle. The capacious mouth forms a long, wide arch; well-developed furrows are present at the corners. The small teeth each have a narrow central cusp flanked by usually one, sometimes more, smaller cusplets on both sides. The five pairs of gill slits are short, with the last pair over the pectoral fin bases.

The first dorsal fin is roughly triangular, with gently convex anterior and posterior margins, and originates over the midpoint of the pelvic fin bases. The second dorsal fin is slightly smaller than the first and similar in shape, and originates over the latter portion of the anal fin base. The pectoral fins are medium-sized and broad. The pelvic fins are sizable and relatively low, with angular corners. In adult males, the inner margins of the pelvic fins are partially fused to form an "apron" over the bases of the claspers, which are very long and thin, reaching past the origin of the small anal fin. The base of the anal fin measures 8–10% of the total length, much less than the distances between either the pelvic and anal fins or the two dorsal fins. The anal fin of the male is 2% shorter than that of the female, which may be related to the function of the unusually long claspers. The caudal peduncle is almost cylindrical, and leads to a low caudal fin with a small lower lobe and a ventral notch near the tip of the upper lobe. The dermal denticles are small and overlapping, each with a leaf-shaped crown bearing a median ridge and three marginal teeth. There is a saw-toothed crest of enlarged denticles along the upper edge of the caudal fin. This species is dark gray above, with a series of faint darker saddles along the body and tail. The underside, inside of the mouth, and trailing margins of the pectoral and dorsal fins are white.

== Biology and ecology ==
The broadfin sawtail catshark is an opportunistic predator known to consume a wide variety of bony fishes (including Sardinops melanostictus, Glossandon semifasciatus, Chlorophthalmus albatrossis and lanternfishes), cephalopods (including sepiolid and enoploteuthid squid), and crustaceans (including isopods, krill, and decapods). Young sharks exhibit greater variation in diet across seasons than immature and mature sharks, which consistently feed predominantly on fish. The dietary composition of young sharks in Suruga Bay differs from that of the co-occurring gecko catshark (G. eastmani), perhaps to reduce interspecific competition.

Reproduction in the broadfin sawtail catshark is oviparous; adult females have a single functional ovary, on the right, and two functional oviducts. Only a single egg may mature within each oviduct at a time. The egg case is vase-shaped and measures roughly 9 cm (3.5 in) long and 2 cm (0.79 in) across, with thick, opaque, brown walls bearing fine, lengthwise grooves; the top of the case is squared off, while the bottom is rounded with a short membraneous projection. Females lay eggs throughout the year, with a peak in December and January. The young shark hatches at about 13 cm (5.1 in) long. Males mature sexually at 51–62 cm (20–24 in) long, and females at 55–61 cm (22–24 in) long.

== Human interactions ==
The International Union for Conservation of Nature (IUCN) assesses it as Least Concern. It is caught incidentally to an unknown degree in bottom trawls operated by commercial deepwater fisheries off Japan and in the East China Sea.
