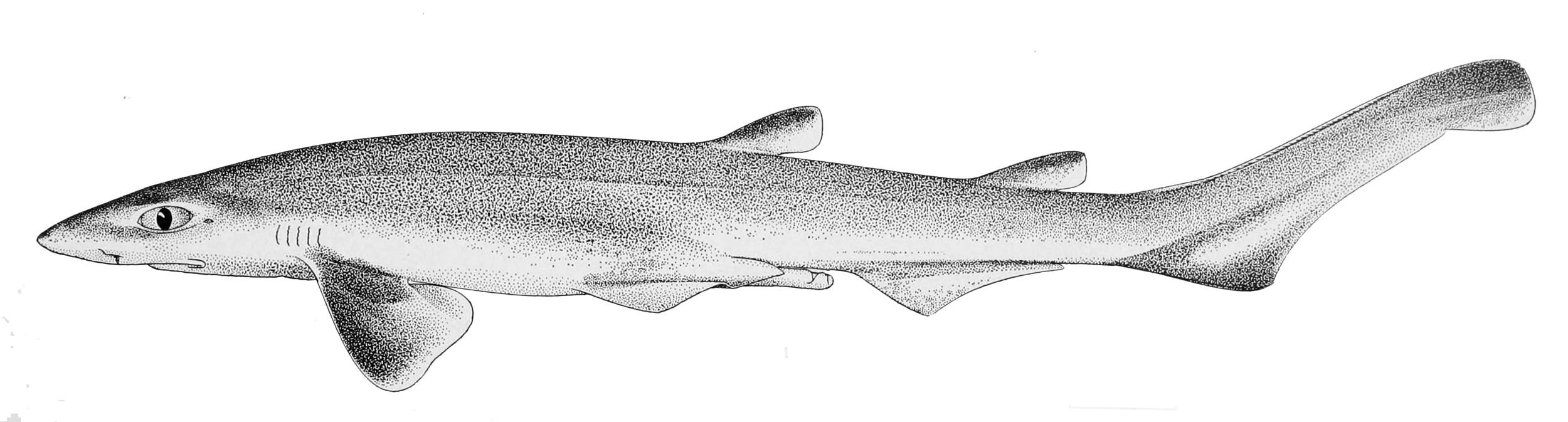

Conservation status
- Least Concern (IUCN 3.1)

Scientific classification
- Kingdom: Animalia
- Phylum: Chordata
- Class: Chondrichthyes
- Subclass: Elasmobranchii
- Division: Selachii
- Order: Carcharhiniformes
- Family: Pentanchidae
- Genus: Galeus
- Species: G. sauteri

Binomial name
- Galeus sauteri (D. S. Jordan & R. E. Richardson, 1909)
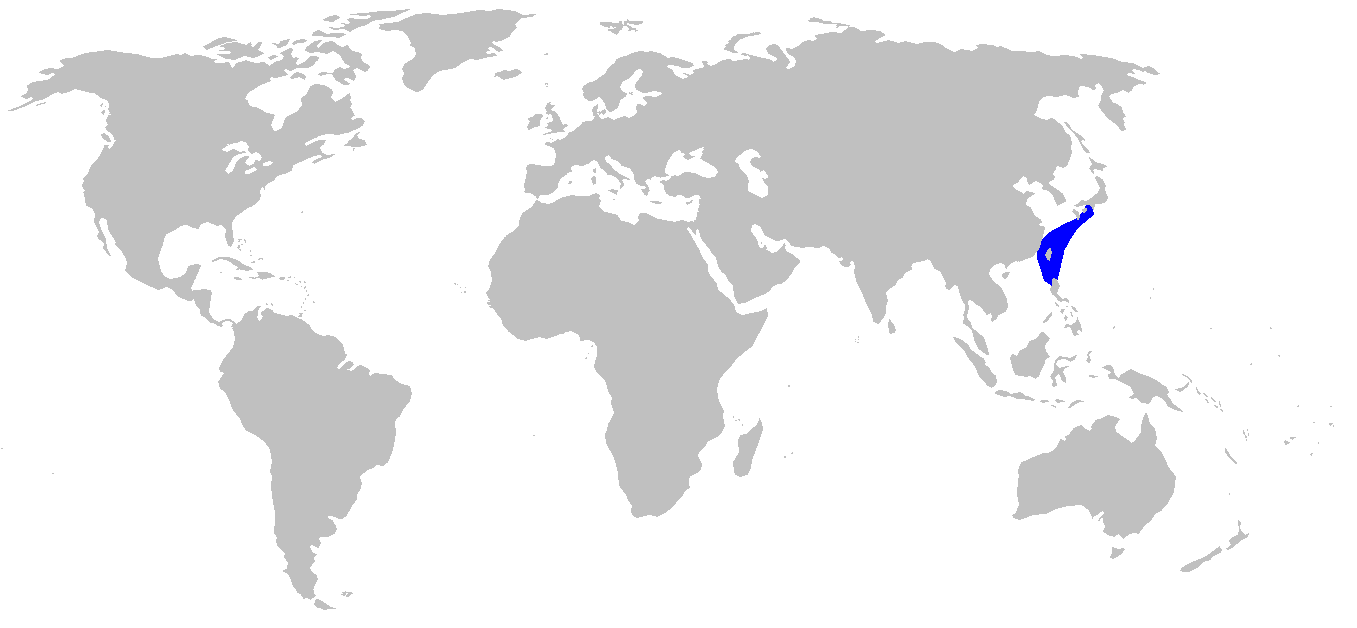
- Range of the blacktip sawtail catshark

Synonyms
- Pristiurus sauteri D. S. Jordan & R. E. Richardson, 1909

= Blacktip sawtail catshark =

Species of shark

The blacktip sawtail catshark (Galeus sauteri) is a species of shark belonging to the family Pentanchidae, the deepwater catsharks, This species is found off the coasts of Taiwan and the Philippines. It is demersal in nature and occurs deeper than 60 m (200 ft). Growing up to 46 cm (18 in) long, this slim-bodied species is characterized by its plain brownish dorsal coloration with dark tips on the dorsal and caudal fins, and a prominent crest of enlarged dermal denticles on the upper edge of the caudal fin. It is oviparous, with females producing encapsulated eggs two at a time year-round. The blacktip sawtail catshark is caught incidentally in bottom trawls and used for fishmeal in Taiwan.

== Taxonomy and phylogeny ==
In 1906, the Carnegie Museum purchased an extensive collection of fishes assembled from the markets of Takao (Kaohsiung), Taiwan by Hans Sauter. American ichthyologists David Starr Jordan and Robert Earl Richardson described several new species from the collection in a 1909 issue of Memoirs of the Carnegie Museum, including a catshark of the genus Pristiurus that they named in Sauter's honor. Jordan and Richardson referenced six syntypes 30–36 cm (12–14 in) long in their description, of which four survive to the present day. Later authors have recognized Pristiurus as a junior synonym of the genus Galeus. A 2005 phylogenetic study, based on mitochondrial and nuclear DNA, found that this species, G. eastmani, and G. gracilis form a clade apart from G. melastomus and G. murinus.

== Distribution and habitat ==
The blacktip sawtail catshark is found in the waters around Taiwan, where it is very common, and the Philippines. It was once thought to occur off southern Japan as well, but recent observations by Kazuhiro Nakaya have determined that this is not the case. This species is found on or near the bottom over the continental shelf. In the Taiwan Strait, it has been recorded over mud at depths of 60–90 cm (24–35 in), while off Guishan Island it is known from 100–200 m (330–660 ft).

== Description ==
A small species, the blacktip sawtail catshark attains a maximum length of 46 cm (18 in). Its body is slim and firm, with the head comprising roughly one-fifth of the total length. The rather long snout is pointed, with large nostrils divided by triangular flaps of skin on their anterior margins. The large, horizontally oval eyes bear rudimentary nictitating membranes (protective third eyelids) and lack prominent ridges underneath. Behind each eye is a small spiracle. The mouth is large and forms a long, wide arch; the corners of the mouth bear well-developed furrows. There are about 70–78 upper and 82 lower tooth rows. Each tooth is small and usually has five cusps, with the central one the longest. The five pairs of gill slits are short, with the fourth and fifth pairs located over the bases of the pectoral fins.

Both dorsal fins are rounded; the first is slightly larger and positioned over the latter half of the pelvic fin bases, while the second is positioned over the latter half of the anal fin base. The pectoral fins are medium-sized and blunt-cornered. The small pelvic fins are low and angular; the claspers of adult males reach the origin of the anal fin. The space between the pelvic and anal fin origins is greater in males than in females. The anal fin is elongated and angular; its base measures 12–15% of the total length, comparable to the distance between the dorsal fins. The caudal peduncle is compressed from side to side, and leads to a low caudal fin with a small lower fin and a ventral notch near the tip of the upper lobe. The body is covered by small, slightly overlapping dermal denticles, which are leaf-shaped with a median ridge and three marginal teeth. A crest of enlarged denticles is present along the upper edge of the caudal fin. This species is a uniform ochre above and white below, with distinctive dark brown tips on the dorsal and caudal fins; the interior of the mouth is light gray.

== Biology and ecology ==
Reproduction in the blacktip sawtail catshark is oviparous and proceeds throughout the year, without well-defined seasonal patterns. Adult females have a single functional ovary, on the right, and two functional oviducts; a single egg matures within each oviduct at a time. The eggs are enclosed in purse-shaped, translucent golden brown capsules measuring about 36–39 cm (14–15 in) long and 15 cm (5.9 in) across. The surface of the capsule is smooth and unlined; there are coiled tendrils on the anterior corners and bundles of long fibers on the posterior corners. Half of all males and females are sexually mature at 35–36 cm (14–14 in) and 41–42 cm (16–17 in) long respectively. A known parasite of this species is the tapeworm Nakayacestus tanyderus.

== Human interactions ==
In Taiwanese waters, blacktip sawtail catsharks of most sizes are frequently caught incidentally in bottom trawls operated by commercial shrimp fisheries. Captured sharks are processed into fishmeal and used in aquaculture. This species is probably also caught incidentally by bottom trawlers in the Philippines, as it has been observed at markets. The International Union for Conservation of Nature (IUCN) has listed the blacktip sawtail catshark as least concern.
