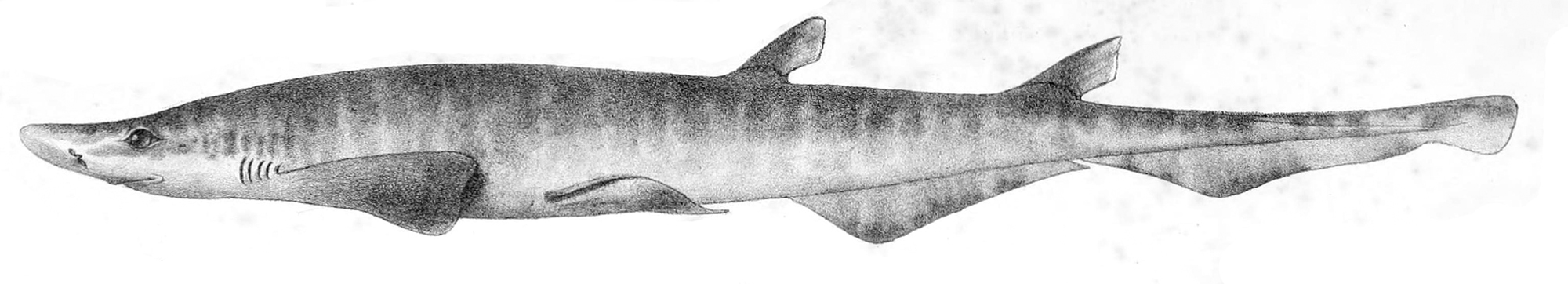

Conservation status
- Near Threatened (IUCN 3.1)

Scientific classification
- Kingdom: Animalia
- Phylum: Chordata
- Class: Chondrichthyes
- Subclass: Elasmobranchii
- Division: Selachii
- Order: Carcharhiniformes
- Family: Pentanchidae
- Genus: Galeus
- Species: G. atlanticus

Binomial name
- Galeus atlanticus (Vaillant, 1888)
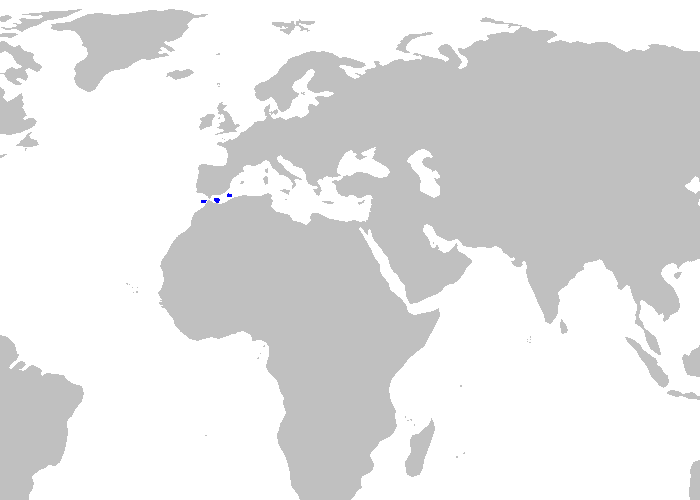
- Range of the Atlantic sawtail catshark

Synonyms
- Pristiurus atlanticus Vaillant, 1888

= Atlantic sawtail catshark =

Species of shark

The Atlantic sawtail catshark (Galeus atlanticus) is a little-known species of deepwater catshark, belonging to the family Pentanchidae, found in a small area of the northeastern Atlantic Ocean, centered on the Strait of Gibraltar and the Alborán Sea. It is found on or close to the bottom over the continental slope, mostly at depths of 400–600 m (1,300–2,000 ft). This shark closely resembles, and was once thought to be the same species as, the blackmouth catshark (G. melastomus); both are slender with a series of dark saddles and blotches along the back and tail, and a prominent crest of enlarged dermal denticles along the dorsal edge of the caudal fin. It differs subtly from G. melastomus in characters including snout length, caudal peduncle depth, and the color of the furrows at the corner of its mouth.

Reproduction in the Atlantic sawtail catshark is oviparous, with females carrying multiple maturing eggs at once. Mating and spawning occur year-round. This species is caught incidentally by commercial deepwater fisheries throughout its range, but the impact of fishing pressure on its population is uncertain as it is not recorded separately from G. melastomus. Given its restricted distribution, it has been assessed as Near Threatened by the International Union for Conservation of Nature (IUCN).

== Taxonomy ==
The original description of the Atlantic sawtail catshark, as Pristiurus atlanticus, was published in 1888 by French naturalist Léon Louis Vaillant, in Expéditions scientifiques du "Travailleur" et du "Talisman" pendant les années 1880, 1881, 1882, 1883. Vaillant based his account on a specimen caught at a depth of 540 m (1,770 ft) off Cape Spartel in northwestern Morocco. This species was long thought to be the same as the closely similar blackmouth catshark (G. melastomus), until it was resurrected by Ramón Muñoz-Chápuli and A. Perez Ortega in 1985. Castilho and colleagues (2007) further affirmed the distinction between G. atlanticus and G. melastomus using morphometric and mitochondrial DNA data.

== Distribution and habitat ==
The Atlantic sawtail catshark is found from Cape St. Vincent in southwestern Portugal, through the Strait of Gibraltar into the Alborán Sea, to as far as Cabo de Gata in southwestern Spain. It is most abundant in the center of the Alborán Sea, and around Isla de Alborán. This species has been recorded a few times off Morocco and once off Mauritania; it may be extremely rare or mistaken for G. melastomus in the region. Its total range has been estimated to encompass 50,000 km^{2} (19,000 mi^{2}), about evenly divided between the northeastern Atlantic and the western Mediterranean.

Demersal in nature, the Atlantic sawtail catshark inhabits the continental slope at a depth of 330–790 m (1,080–2,590 ft), and is most common between 400 and 600 m (1,300 and 2,000 ft). There is a lone record from shallower than 50 m (160 ft). This species does not exhibit spatial segregation by either sex or size, or conduct seasonal migrations.

== Description ==
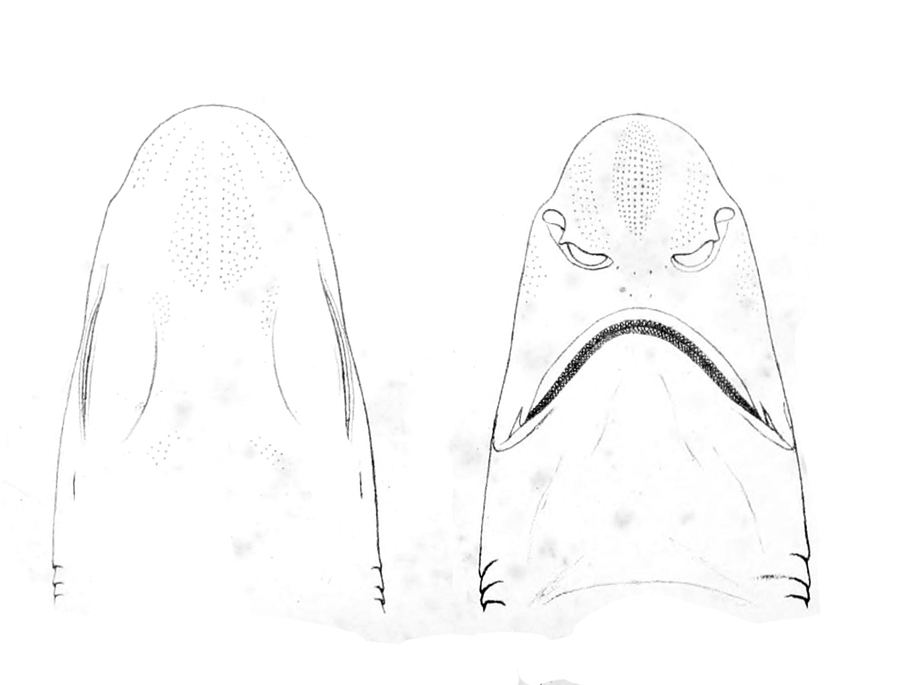
Dorsal and ventral views of the head of the Atlantic sawtail catshark

The Atlantic sawtail catshark reaches a maximum known length of 45 cm (18 in). Slender and firm-bodied, it has a slightly flattened head with a moderately long, flattened snout. The head is proportionately shorter and narrower, and the nostrils relatively farther from the snout tip, than in G. melastomus. The nostrils are partially covered by triangular flaps of skin on their anterior rims. The eyes are horizontally oval and equipped with rudimentary nictitating membranes (protective third eyelids). There is a slight ridge below each eye, and a minute spiracle behind. The large mouth is wide and curved, with rather long furrows around the corners. The small teeth each have a narrow central cusp flanked by multiple smaller cusplets on either side. There are five pairs of gill slits.

The first dorsal fin is positioned over the latter portion of the pelvic fin bases, while the second is positioned over the latter portion of the anal fin base. Both dorsal fins are angular and similar in size. The pectoral fins are large and wide, with rounded corners. The short, low pelvic fins are placed close to the anal fin, which is elongated and angular. The caudal peduncle is compressed from side to side; its height is greater than in G. melastomus, exceeding 4.5% of the total length. The caudal fin is low, with a small lower lobe and a ventral notch near the tip of the upper lobe. The skin is covered by dermal denticles, each with a leaf-shaped crown bearing a median ridge and three marginal teeth. A prominent crest of enlarged denticles runs along the front portion of the dorsal caudal fin margin. The coloration is gray above and pale below, with a series of dark gray saddles or blotches along the back and tail. The dorsal fins are dusky at the base and lighten towards the trailing margins. The trailing margin of the caudal fin is black, as is the interior of the mouth. The inside of the furrows at the corners of the mouth are dark, in contrast to G. melastomus where they are light.

== Biology and ecology ==
The Atlantic sawtail catshark is rarer than the blackmouth catshark, which shares its range. Its natural history is poorly understood. Reproduction is oviparous, with mating and spawning proceeding throughout the year. Females can contain up to nine maturing eggs at a time, divided between the two functional oviducts. The tough egg case is flask-shaped and reddish, with a rounded bottom and a pair of "horns" at the top, and measuring around 3.1–3.8 cm (1.2–1.5 in) long and 1.1–1.3 cm (0.43–0.51 in) across. The egg case of G. melastomus is similar in appearance but significantly larger. Once deposited, the egg hatches within a short period of time. According to Compagno (2005), males attain sexual maturity at about 38–42 cm (15–17 in) long, and females at about 40–45 cm (16–18 in) long. Rey and colleagues (2010) reported the smallest mature males and females in their study to be 33 cm (13 in) and 37 cm (15 in) long respectively.

== Human interactions ==
Fishery data for the Atlantic sawtail catshark is inadequate as it is still recorded as G. melastomus by observers. This species is caught incidentally on deepwater longlines and bottom trawls targeting other species, including wreckfish (Polyprion americanus), conger eel (Conger conger), Norway lobster (Nephrops norvegicus), and red shrimp (Aristeus antennatus). Most landed sharks are discarded and likely suffer high mortality due to damage sustained during capture; the larger specimens are marketed for human consumption. Given the small extent of its range and the ubiquitous heavy fishing pressure within, the International Union for Conservation of Nature (IUCN) has assessed this shark as Near Threatened.
