= G. atlanticus =

G. atlanticus may refer to:

- Galeus atlanticus, the Atlantic sawtail catshark, a ground shark species
- Glaucus atlanticus, a nudibranch species
