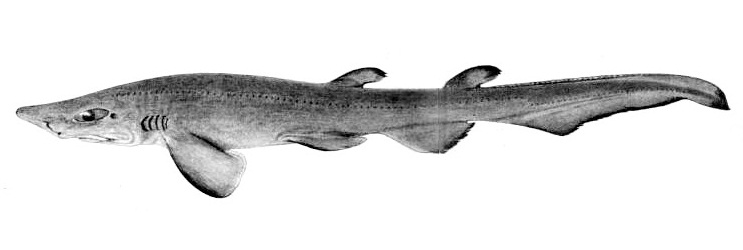

Conservation status
- Least Concern (IUCN 3.1)

Scientific classification
- Kingdom: Animalia
- Phylum: Chordata
- Class: Chondrichthyes
- Subclass: Elasmobranchii
- Division: Selachii
- Order: Carcharhiniformes
- Family: Pentanchidae
- Genus: Galeus
- Species: G. murinus

Binomial name
- Galeus murinus (Collett, 1904)
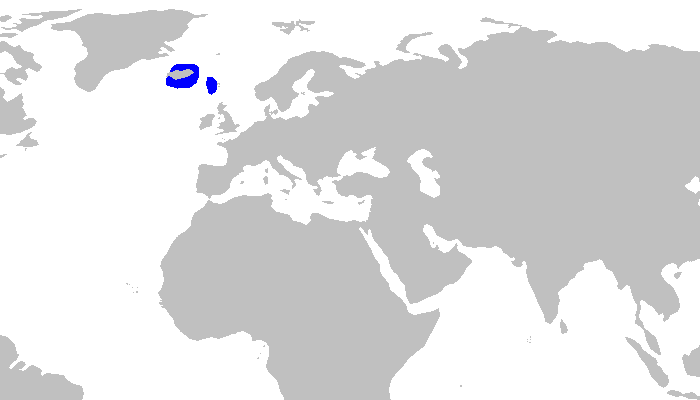
- Range of the mouse catshark

Synonyms
- Pristiurus jensenii Saemundsson, 1922; Pristiurus murinus Collett, 1904

= Mouse catshark =

Species of shark

The mouse catshark (Galeus murinus) is a species of shark belonging to the family Pentanchidae, the deepwater catsharks. It is common in the northeastern Atlantic Ocean from Iceland to Western Sahara. There is much taxonomic confusion regarding this species in Icelandic waters, where it may be confounded with another species of Galeus or Apristurus. Probably not exceeding 49 cm (19 in) long, the mouse catshark has a uniformly brown body and is characterized by large, rounded pelvic fins and crests of enlarged dermal denticles along both the dorsal and ventral caudal fin margins. In addition, in adult males the inner margins of the pelvic fins are merged into an "apron".

Demersal in nature, the mouse catshark inhabits continental slopes at a depth of 380–1,300 m (1,250–4,270 ft). It preys mainly on benthic crustaceans, bony fishes, and cephalopods. Reproduction is oviparous, with females producing "furry" egg capsules. Although it is caught incidentally by commercial trawl fisheries, this species does not appear to be threatened by fishing activities and has been listed under Least Concern by the International Union for Conservation of Nature (IUCN).

== Taxonomy and phylogeny ==
Norwegian zoologist Robert Collett originally described the mouse catshark as Pristiurus murinus, in a 1904 issue of the scientific journal Forhandlinger i Videnskabs-selskabet i Christiania; its specific epithet means "relating to a mouse" in Latin. The type specimen is an immature female 22 cm (8.7 in) long, collected 150 km (93 mi) northwest of the Hebrides at a depth of 1,100–1,300 m (3,600–4,300 ft). Later authors have recognized Pristiurus as a junior synonym of Galeus.

Some taxonomic confusion has arisen over Pristiurus jensenii, described from Iceland by Bjarni Sæmundsson in 1922, which has traditionally been considered the same species as G. murinus. Recently reported data for G. murinus have shown inconsistencies between sharks from Iceland and elsewhere, suggesting that P. jensenii may in fact be a valid species very similar to G. murinus. However, an alternate possibility is that some of the data may have been confounded with a species of Apristurus. The placement of G. murinus within Galeus is problematic as it does not much resemble the more typical members of the genus. On the other hand, a 2005 phylogenetic analysis by Samuel Iglésias and colleagues, based on mitochondrial and nuclear DNA, found that G. murinus forms a clade with G. melastomus, apart from the clade of G. eastmani, G. sauteri, and G. gracilis.

== Distribution and habitat ==
Fairly common, the mouse catshark has recently been found to be more widespread in the northeastern Atlantic than previously thought, occurring from western Iceland and the Faroe Islands to the Hebrides, Scotland, and Ireland, to as far south as France and Western Sahara. This species is found on or near the bottom over the continental slope, in water 380–1,300 m (1,250–4,270 ft) deep. It has been reported from a depth of 656–1,731 m (2,152–5,679 ft) off Iceland, but the figure is confounded by taxonomic confusion.

== Description ==
The maximum length of the mouse catshark has been variously reported as 49 cm (19 in) and 85 cm (33 in). The larger figure comes from Iceland and is reflective of the aforementioned taxonomic confusion, as the specimen of P. jensenii described by Bjarni Sæmundsson was 63 cm (25 in) long. This species has a firm body with a rather long, blunt snout. The nostrils are divided by triangular flaps of skin in front. The eyes are horizontally oval and equipped with rudimentary nictitating membranes (protective third eyelids). A thin ridge is present beneath each eye, and a tiny spiracle behind. The large mouth forms a wide arch, and bears well-developed furrows at the corners. The teeth have a narrow central cusp and multiple lateral cusplets on either side. There are five pairs of gill slits.

The first dorsal fin has a rounded tip and is positioned over the aft portion of the pelvic fins. The second dorsal fin is similar in size and shape as the first, and is positioned over the aft portion of the anal fin. The pectoral fins are large and broad. The pelvic fins are distinctive, being large and wide with an evenly rounded margin. In adult males, the inner margins of the pelvic fins are fused together to form an "apron" partially covering the claspers. The anal fin is large and angular; its base measures roughly 12–13% of the total length, much longer than the distance between the dorsal fins. The pelvic, anal, and caudal fins are all very close to each other. The caudal peduncle is cylindrical and the caudal fin is low, with a small lower lobe and a ventral notch near the tip of the upper lobe. The dermal denticles are small and overlapping; each has an arrowhead-shaped crown bearing a horizontal ridge and three marginal teeth. There is a prominent crest of enlarged denticles along the dorsal caudal fin margin. Unusually for the genus, there is also a similar denticle crest along the underside of the caudal peduncle, extending to the forward portion of the ventral caudal fin margin. This shark is plain brown, lightening slightly on the underside; the interior of the mouth is dark.

== Biology and ecology ==
The diet of the mouse catshark consists primarily of shrimp such as Pasiphaea multidentata and Sergestes robustus, other crustaceans such as Dorhynchus thomsoni, bony fishes such as Micromesistius poutassou, and cephalopods. Most prey organisms are captured on or close to the sea floor. Reproduction is oviparous; the female has two oviducts, with one egg maturing inside each at a time. The egg capsules are golden yellow and vase-shaped, measuring 5.4–5.6 cm (2.1–2.2 in) long and 1.4–1.7 cm (0.55–0.67 in) across. The top of the capsule is squared off, while the bottom comes to a short projection. The capsule surface is thickly covered by fibers, giving it a hairy appearance. The young are estimated to hatch at a length of approximately 8–9 cm (3.1–3.5 in).

== Human interactions ==
The mouse catshark is frequently caught incidentally by commercial trawl fisheries operating in deep water off Europe and western Africa. However, it may be small enough to escape most nets, and there are likely parts of its wide range that see little fishing activity. Because there are no substantial threats to its population, the International Union for Conservation of Nature (IUCN) has assessed this species as of Least Concern.
