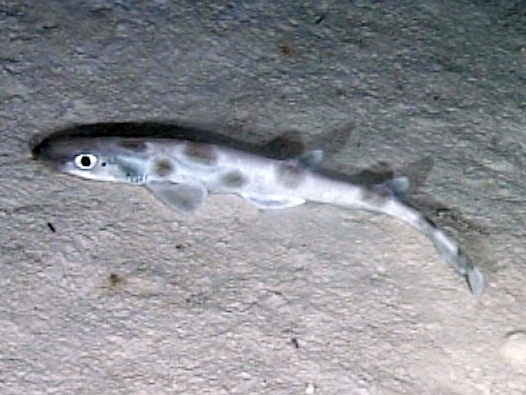

Conservation status
- Least Concern (IUCN 3.1)

Scientific classification
- Kingdom: Animalia
- Phylum: Chordata
- Class: Chondrichthyes
- Subclass: Elasmobranchii
- Division: Selachii
- Order: Carcharhiniformes
- Family: Pentanchidae
- Genus: Galeus
- Species: G. arae

Binomial name
- Galeus arae (Nichols, 1927)
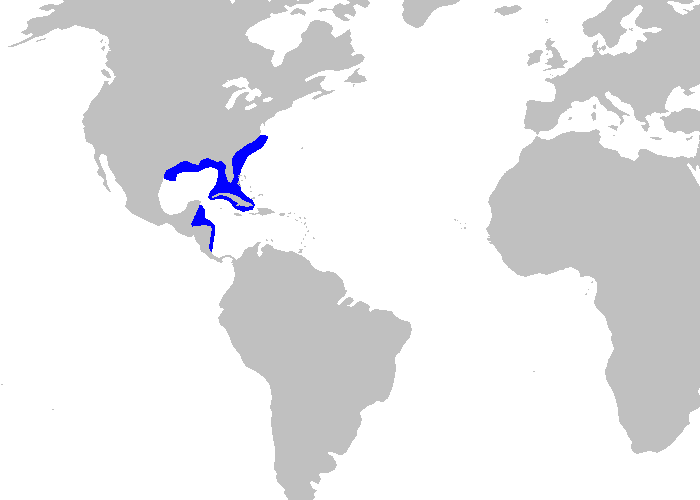
- Range of the roughtail catshark

Synonyms
- Pristiurus arae Nichols, 1927

= Roughtail catshark =

Species of shark

The roughtail catshark or marbled catshark (Galeus arae) is a common species of deepwater catshark, belonging to the family Pentanchidae. It is found at a depth of 36–702 m (118–2,303 ft) in the northwestern Atlantic Ocean, the Gulf of Mexico, and the Caribbean Sea, from North Carolina to Costa Rica. Individuals of different sexes and ages are segregated to some degree. A small species not exceeding 33 cm (13 in) in length, the roughtail catshark has a slender body with a marbled color pattern of dark saddles and spots, and a prominent crest of enlarged dermal denticles along the dorsal edge of its caudal fin. This species feeds mainly on shrimp and is oviparous. It is caught incidentally in shrimp trawls, though trawl fisheries within its range mostly do not operate at the depths it inhabits. As a result, the International Union for Conservation of Nature has listed it under Least Concern.

== Taxonomy ==
John T. Nichols of the American Museum of Natural History originally described the roughtail catshark as Pristiurus arae in a 1927 issue of American Museum Novitates. He named the species after the trawler Ara, which collected the first two specimens, both 16 cm (6.3 in) long immature females, off Miami Beach on March 31, 1926. Later authors have recognized Pristiurus as a junior synonym of Galeus. The Antilles catshark (G. antillensis) and the longfin sawtail catshark (G. cadenati) were regarded as subspecies of G. arae, until taxonomic revisions were published by Hera Konstantinou and colleagues in 1998 and 2000. The three species, along with the southern and Springer's sawtail catsharks (G. mincaronei and G. springeri), are grouped together in the G. arae species complex.

== Description ==
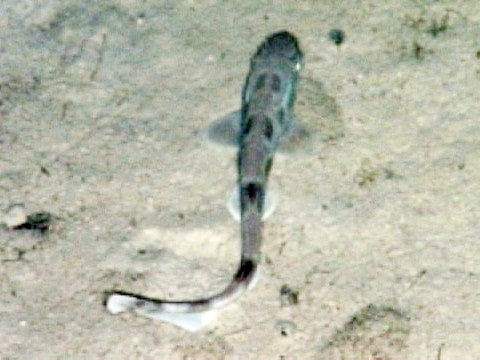
The roughtail catshark has a slender body with dark saddle markings.

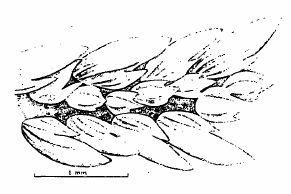
Close-up of the denticles on the roughtail catshark's caudal fin dorsal crest.

Probably the smallest member of the G. arae species complex, the roughtail catshark grows no longer than 33 cm (13 in). It has a slender, firm body and a slightly flattened head. The snout is rather long and pointed, with the nostrils divided by triangular skin flaps in front. The horizontally oval eyes are equipped with rudimentary nictitating membranes (protective third eyelids), and lack prominent ridges underneath. There is a tiny spiracle behind each eye. The mouth is large and forms a broad arch, with moderately long furrows around the corners. The teeth are small and number 59–65 rows in the upper jaw and 58–60 rows in the lower jaw. Each tooth has a thin central cusp flanked by 1–3 pairs of cusplets on either side. There are five pairs of gill slits.

The first dorsal fin has a blunt apex and is positioned over the latter half of the pelvic fin bases. The second dorsal fin is nearly as large as the first and similar in shape, and positioned over the latter half of the anal fin base. The large, broad pectoral fins have rounded corners. The pelvic and anal fins are low and angular. The anal fin base measures roughly 10–14% of the total length, exceeding the distance between the pelvic and anal fins and about the same as the distance between the dorsal fins. The caudal fin is low, with a small lower lobe and a ventral notch near the tip of the upper lobe. The dermal denticles are small and overlapping; each has a leaf-shaped crown with a horizontal ridge and three marginal teeth. There is a prominent saw-toothed crest, formed from enlarged denticles, along the anterior portion of the dorsal caudal fin margin. This species is yellowish brown above with a marbled color pattern consisting of usually fewer than 11 dark saddles along the back and tail. Some smaller sharks have markings that form horizontal lines, while some larger sharks have round blotches along the sides. These markings can range from faint to well-defined by white outlines. The underside is pale, and the inside of the mouth is black.

== Distribution and habitat ==
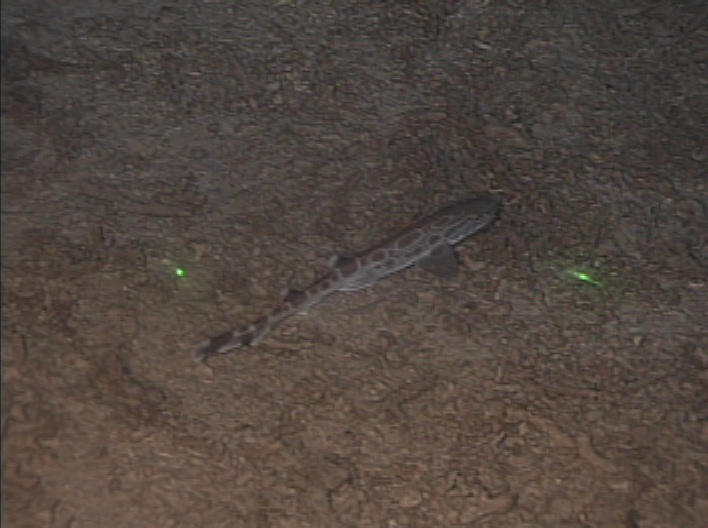
A roughtail catshark near the base of a Lophelia reef off Cape Canaveral, Florida.

While the full extent of its range may remain to be documented, the roughtail catshark seems to have a disjunct distribution that does not overlap with that of either G. antillensis or G. cadenati. The northern population occurs from North Carolina southward to the Caribbean and the Yucatan Peninsula, and westward to the Mississippi River Delta. The southern population is found in the Caribbean Sea off the coasts of Honduras, Nicaragua, and Costa Rica.

The roughtail catshark is a demersal species typically inhabiting continental and insular slopes, occasionally venturing onto the shelf. It is abundant but unevenly distributed, with some areas harboring hundreds of sharks and other areas none at all. Sharks of the northern population have been recorded from depths of 36–732 m (118–2,402 ft), and those of the southern population from 338–631 m (1,109–2,070 ft). The shallowest records have tended to come from higher latitudes, suggesting that temperature plays more of a role than depth in determining the species' distribution; it has been captured from water ranging from 5.6 to 11.1 °C (42.1 to 52.0 °F). Both adults and juveniles occur up to a depth of 450 m (1,480 ft), while usually only adults are found deeper. There also appears to be spatial segregation by sex, though the patterns are not well-defined.

== Biology and ecology ==
The roughtail catshark preys mostly on shrimp, and may gather in sizable schools. Once erroneously reported to be aplacental viviparous, more recent research has confirmed that this species is actually oviparous. Adult females have a single functional ovary, on the right, and two functional oviducts. A single egg matures within each oviduct at a time. The eggs are enclosed within tough, flask-shaped capsules around 4.9–5.1 cm (1.9–2.0 in) long, 1.2–1.4 cm (0.47–0.55 in) across the top, and 1.6 cm (0.63 in) across the bottom. The rounded upper corners of the capsule bear coiled tendrils. The spawning grounds of this shark may be located in very rough terrain. Both sexes mature sexually at approximately 27–33 cm (11–13 in) long.

== Human interactions ==
Harmless and of no commercial value, the roughtail catshark is too small to be caught on most types of fishing gear but is taken incidentally in shrimp trawls. Shark expert Stewart Springer reported in 1966 that it was frequently caught in shrimp trawls along the entire coast of Florida. The impact of trawl fisheries on this species in United States waters is unknown; its depth and spawning habitat preferences may offer a degree of protection from fishing pressure. Similarly, shrimp trawling activity off Central America does not extend into the depths occupied by this species. The International Union for Conservation of Nature (IUCN) has therefore assessed the roughtail catshark as of Least Concern.
