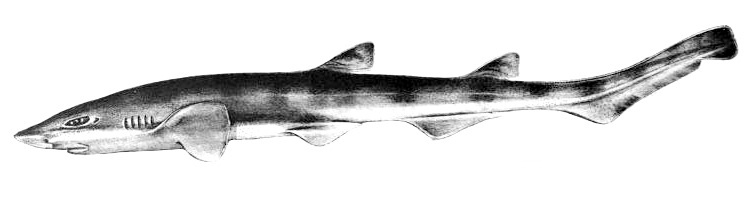

Conservation status
- Least Concern (IUCN 3.1)

Scientific classification
- Kingdom: Animalia
- Phylum: Chordata
- Class: Chondrichthyes
- Subclass: Elasmobranchii
- Division: Selachii
- Order: Carcharhiniformes
- Family: Pentanchidae
- Genus: Galeus
- Species: G. eastmani

Binomial name
- Galeus eastmani (D. S. Jordan & Snyder, 1904)
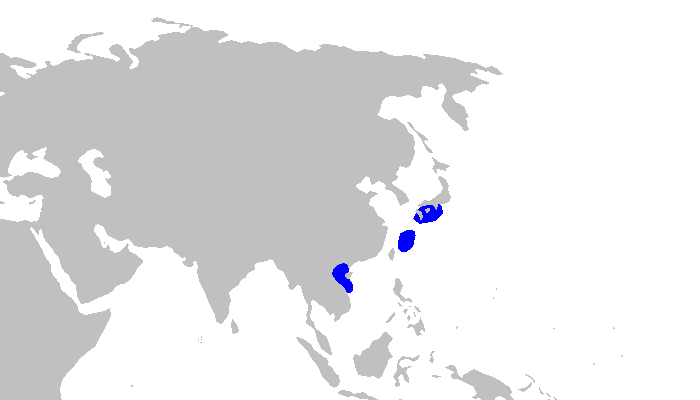
- Range of the gecko catshark

Synonyms
- Pristiurus eastmani D. S. Jordan & Snyder, 1904

= Gecko catshark =

Species of shark

The gecko catshark (Galeus eastmani) is a species of deepwater catshark, belonging to the family Pentanchidae, native to the northwestern Pacific Ocean from southern Japan to Taiwan, and possibly also off Vietnam. It is a common, demersal species found at depths of 100–900 m (330–2,950 ft). Its body is slender, with a pattern of dark saddles and blotches. The dorsal and caudal fins are edged in white, and there is a prominent crest of enlarged dermal denticles along the dorsal edge of the caudal fin. The gecko catshark is a schooling, opportunistic predator of bony fishes, cephalopods, and crustaceans. It is oviparous, with females producing two vase-shaped egg capsules at a time. This species is captured as bycatch, but does not appear to be threatened by fishery activities at present and has been assessed as Least Concern by the International Union for Conservation of Nature (IUCN).

== Etymology ==
Although the honor for this Catshark is not named, it is possibly in honor of fish paleontologist Charles Rochester Eastman (1868-1918).

== Taxonomy and phylogeny ==
The first known specimen of the gecko catshark, a 35 cm (14 in) long female caught off the Izu Peninsula of Japan, was presented to American ichthyologists David Starr Jordan and John Otterbein Snyder by Alan Owston, a shipmaster from Yokohama. Jordan and Snyder described the species as Pristiurus eastmani in a 1904 volume of the scientific journal Smithsonian Miscellaneous Collections. Later authors have recognized Pristiurus as a junior synonym of Galeus. A 2005 phylogenetic analysis, based on mitochondrial and nuclear DNA, found that this species, G. gracilis, and G. sauteri form a clade apart from G. melastomus and G. murinus.

== Distribution and habitat ==
The range of the gecko catshark extends from southern Japan, where it occurs off the Shizuoka and Mie Prefectures of Honshu and the main islands of Shikoku and Kyushu, to the East China Sea including Taiwan. It is extremely abundant in Japanese waters. Further records from off Vietnam may be erroneous. This species is found in water 100–900 m (330–2,950 ft) deep, on or close to the sea floor. It seems to exhibit strong spatial segregation by sex.

== Description ==
Attaining 40 cm (16 in), possibly 50 cm (20 in) in length, the gecko catshark has a slim, firm body and a fairly short head that comprises less than one-fifth of the total length. The snout is flattened with a blunt tip. The nostrils are large and divided by triangular flaps of skin on their anterior rims. The eyes are large and horizontally oval, with rudimentary nictitating membranes (protective third eyelids) and indistinct ridges underneath. The mouth is sizable and forms a long arch; there are well-developed furrows around the corners. The teeth are small and number around 47 rows in the upper jaw and 50 rows in the lower jaw; each has a narrow central cusp and typically two pairs of smaller cusplets on the sides. The five pairs of gill slits are short, with the fourth pair about level with the pectoral fin origins.

The first dorsal fin has a blunt apex and is positioned over the latter half of the pelvic fin bases. The second dorsal fin resembles the first but is slightly smaller, and is positioned over the latter third of the anal fin base. The pectoral fins are rather large and broad, with rounded corners. The pelvic fins are small with angular margins; the claspers of adult males are short and do not reach the anal fin. The anal fin base measures roughly 12% of the total length, shorter than the distance between the dorsal fins but longer than the distance between the pelvic and anal fins. The caudal peduncle is almost cylindrical, and leads to a low caudal fin with a subtle lower lobe and a ventral notch near the tip of the upper lobe. The skin is covered by small, overlapping dermal denticles; each has a leaf-shaped crown with a horizontal ridge and three marginal teeth. There is a crest of enlarged denticles along the upper edge of the caudal fin. This species is grayish above and patterned with darker, fuzzy-edged saddles and blotches along the body and tail. The underside, dorsal and caudal fin trailing margins, and interior of the mouth are white.

== Biology and ecology ==
Schooling in nature, the gecko catshark feeds opportunistically on a wide variety of bony fishes (including lanternfish), cephalopods (including sepiolid and enoploteuthid squid), and crustaceans (including isopods, amphipods, krill, and decapods). The relative importance of the three prey categories varies between geographical areas and seasons, likely reflecting what is most available in the environment. This species is oviparous; adult females have a single functional ovary, on the right, and two functional oviducts. A single egg matures within each oviduct at a time. Mature eggs are contained within smooth, translucent yellow, vase-shaped capsules measuring roughly 6 cm (2.4 in) long and 1.6 cm (0.63 in) across, with the top squared off and the bottom converging on a short projection. One study in Suruga Bay recorded females with large yolked ova inside the ovary year-round, but females in the western part of the bay were only found to carry egg cases from October to January, suggesting that the interval between egg depositions is shorter at that time. Males and females attain sexual maturity at approximately 31–32 cm (12–13 in) and 36–37 cm (14–15 in) long respectively. However, there is a Taiwanese record of an immature male 38 cm (15 in) long.

== Human interactions ==
Uncertain numbers of gecko catsharks are caught incidentally by commercial trawl fisheries. In Taiwan, it is occasionally brought to market and processed into fishmeal for aquacultural use. This species' small size and oviparous mode of reproduction may make it more resilient to fishing pressure than other sharks. As the gecko catshark remains common off Japan and may be protected from fishing in the deeper parts of its range, the International Union for Conservation of Nature (IUCN) has assessed it as of Least Concern.
