= Charles R. Eastman =

American paleontologist

Charles Rochester Eastman (1868–1918) was an American geologist and palaeontologist with a special interest in fish. An author of journal and magazine articles, especially in the field of palaeontology, he was employed as a museum curator and active in American scientific societies.

== Biography ==
Charles was born to Mary Eastman in Cedar Rapids, Iowa on June 5, 1868, his father was Austin Eastman. His higher education progressed from work at Harvard to Johns Hopkins universities, then travelled to Munich in 1892 to complete a PhD in 1894. He married Caroline A Clark, one of three daughters of Alvan G. Clark; her father was a manufacturer of high quality telescopes who made several astronomical discoveries. Charles Eastman and his wife resided at one of several large houses surrounding the successful Clark company's workshop.

On July 4, 1900, Eastman shot his brother-in-law Richard H. Grogan Jr. Eastman claimed that the gun had gone off by accident; however, some statements made by Grogan before his death led law enforcement to believe that Eastman may have intentionally shot Grogan. On May 11, 1901, Eastman was found not guilty.

He was reported as drowned at Long Beach in New York on September 27, 1918. The New York Times noted the cause of death as presumed to be the result of overwork for the War Trade Board while recovering after the influenza outbreak known as Spanish flu, and that he had fallen into the sea fully clothed after fainting at the end of a boardwalk.

== Works ==
Eastman's works included geology, and was employed by the New England USGS, but his interest in fossil and modern fish remained the focus throughout his career. Including his submissions to geological surveys, his list publications numbers over one hundred. He was curator at Harvard's Museum of Comparative Zoology and later at Pittsburgh's Carnegie Museum.

His early studies and interests included the placoderms. While in Germany he examined a collection of fossil teeth from the "Chalk Measures shark", he later translated a palaeontology text from the German language. While spending six months in prison, awaiting trial for murder, Eastman continued with his research and studies. Eastman was a member of natural history societies, and a fellow of the American Association for the Advancement of Science.

== Taxon named in his honor ==
Although the honor for the Catshark Galeus eastmani is not named, it is possibly in honor of fish paleontologist Charles Rochester Eastman (1868-1918).
