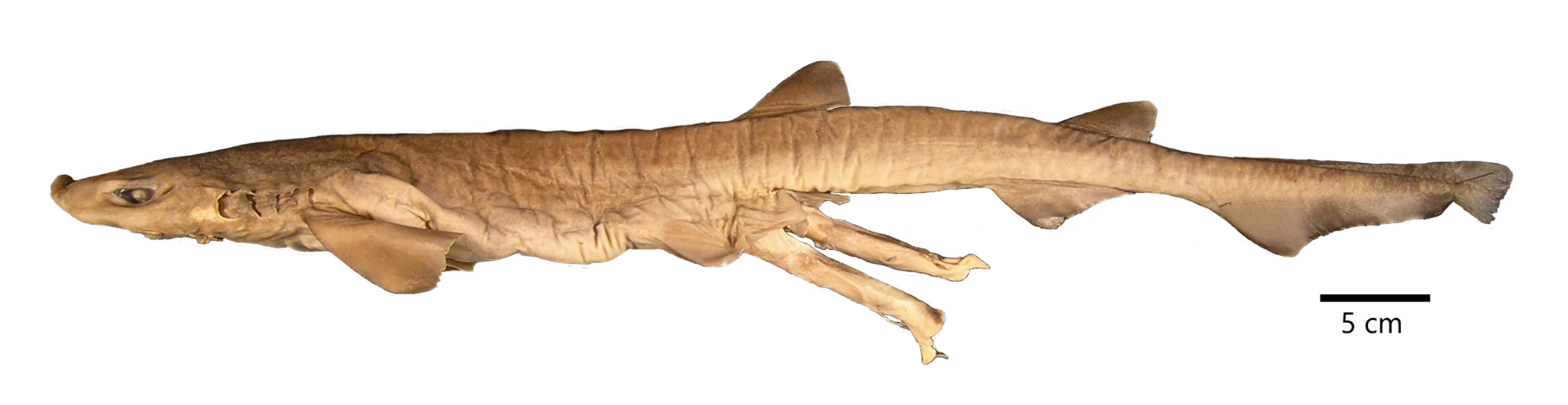
- Holotype specimen (preserved)
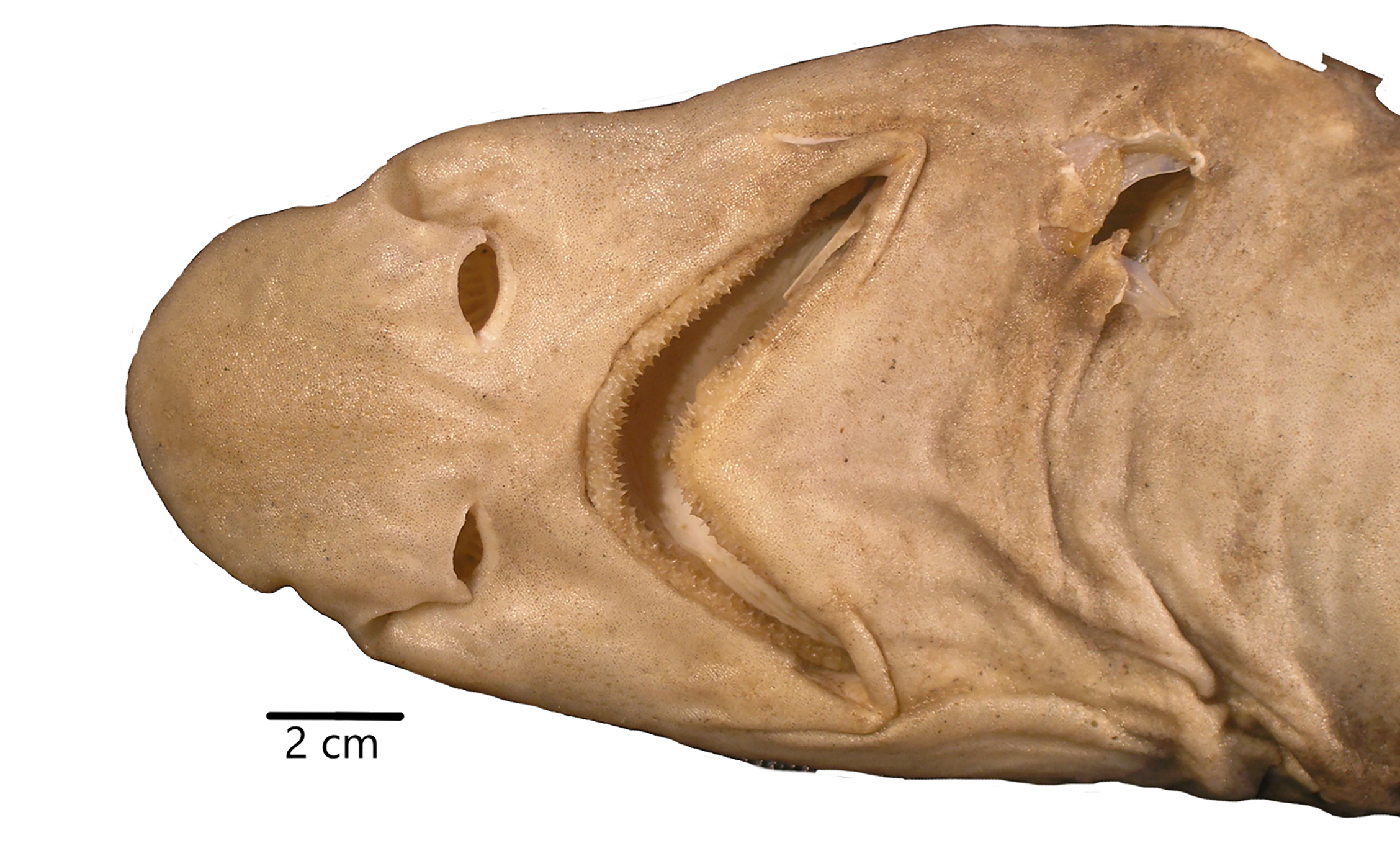
- Preserved head

Scientific classification
- Kingdom: Animalia
- Phylum: Chordata
- Class: Chondrichthyes
- Subclass: Elasmobranchii
- Division: Selachii
- Order: Carcharhiniformes
- Family: Pentanchidae
- Genus: Galeus
- Species: G. friedrichi

Binomial name
- Galeus friedrichi Ebert & Jang, 2022
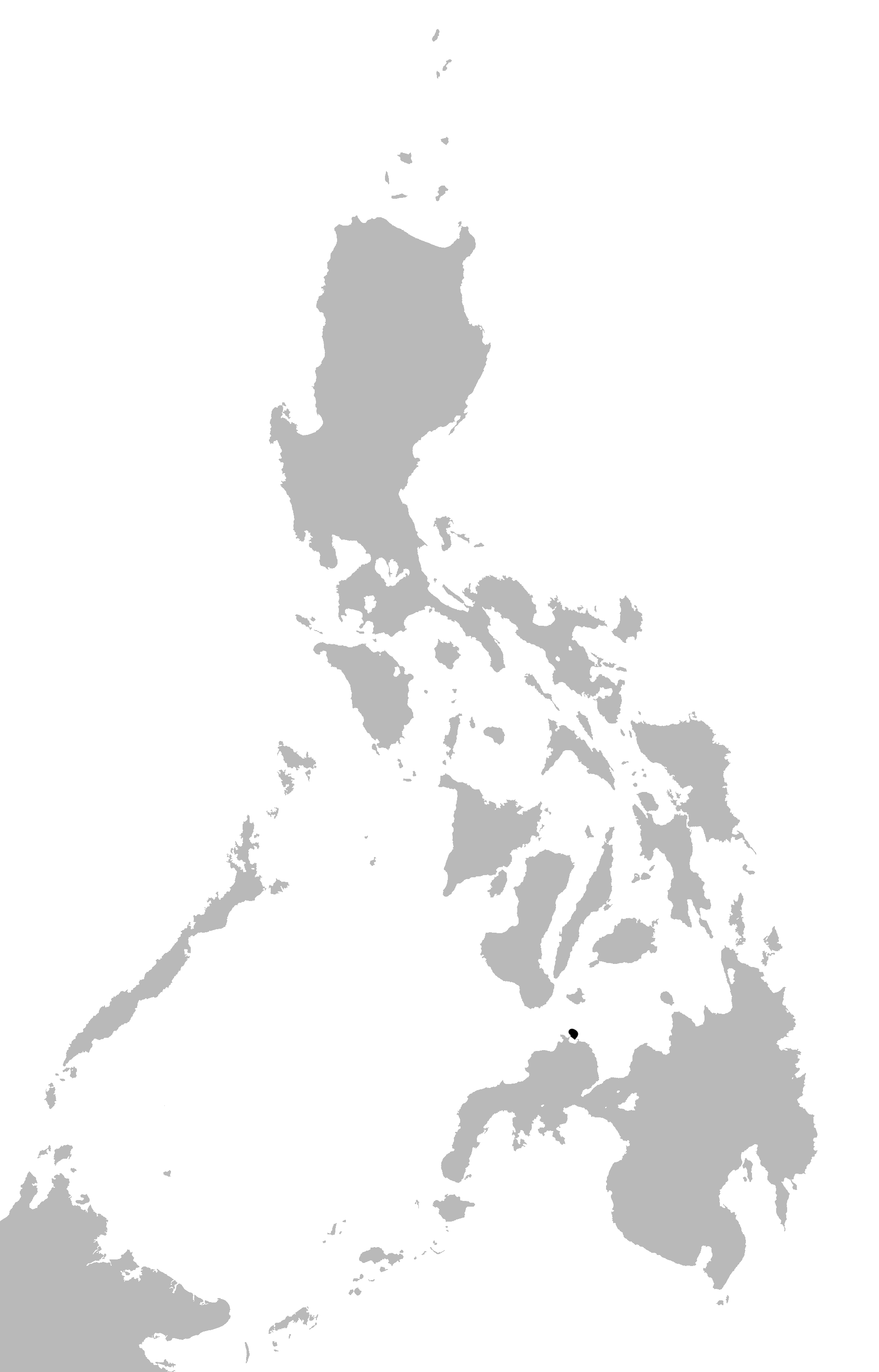
- Suspected range of the Philippines sawtail catshark in black

= Philippines sawtail catshark =

Species of shark

The Philippines sawtail catshark (Galeus friedrichi) is a rare species of sawtail catshark belonging to the family Pentanchidae, the deepwater catsharks. This species is native to the Philippines and is not known to attack humans. Only three specimens have been caught.

== Distribution and habitat ==
This shark is endemic to marine waters off Dapitan, Philippines. All three specimens have been caught in water approximately 500 metres (1,600 ft) deep.

== Anatomy and appearance ==
It has enlarged denticles on the caudal fin, giving it a ''sawtail'' appearance like all other sawtail catsharks. The shark's body and caudal fin are not blotched. It also grows to 50 centimetres (20 in) TL and has more vertebrae, distinguishing it from all other catsharks.

== Etymology ==
The shark is named in honor of German philanthropist Jürgen Friedrich, the co-founder of the JAF Foundation in Switzerland, because of his commitment to marine conservation, research, and advocacy.
