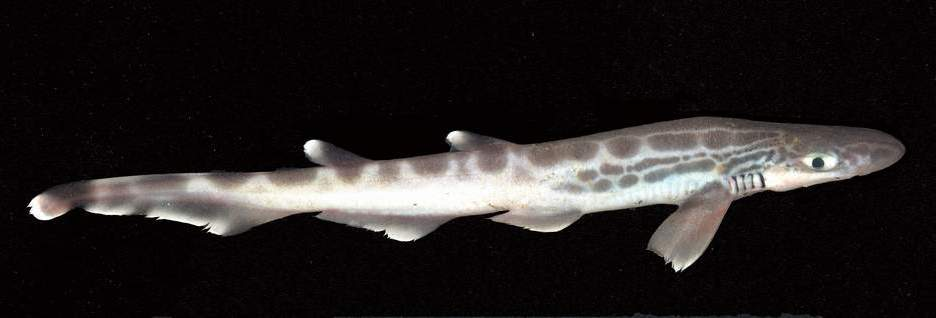

Conservation status
- Least Concern (IUCN 3.1)

Scientific classification
- Kingdom: Animalia
- Phylum: Chordata
- Class: Chondrichthyes
- Subclass: Elasmobranchii
- Division: Selachii
- Order: Carcharhiniformes
- Family: Pentanchidae
- Genus: Galeus
- Species: G. melastomus

Binomial name
- Galeus melastomus Rafinesque, 1810
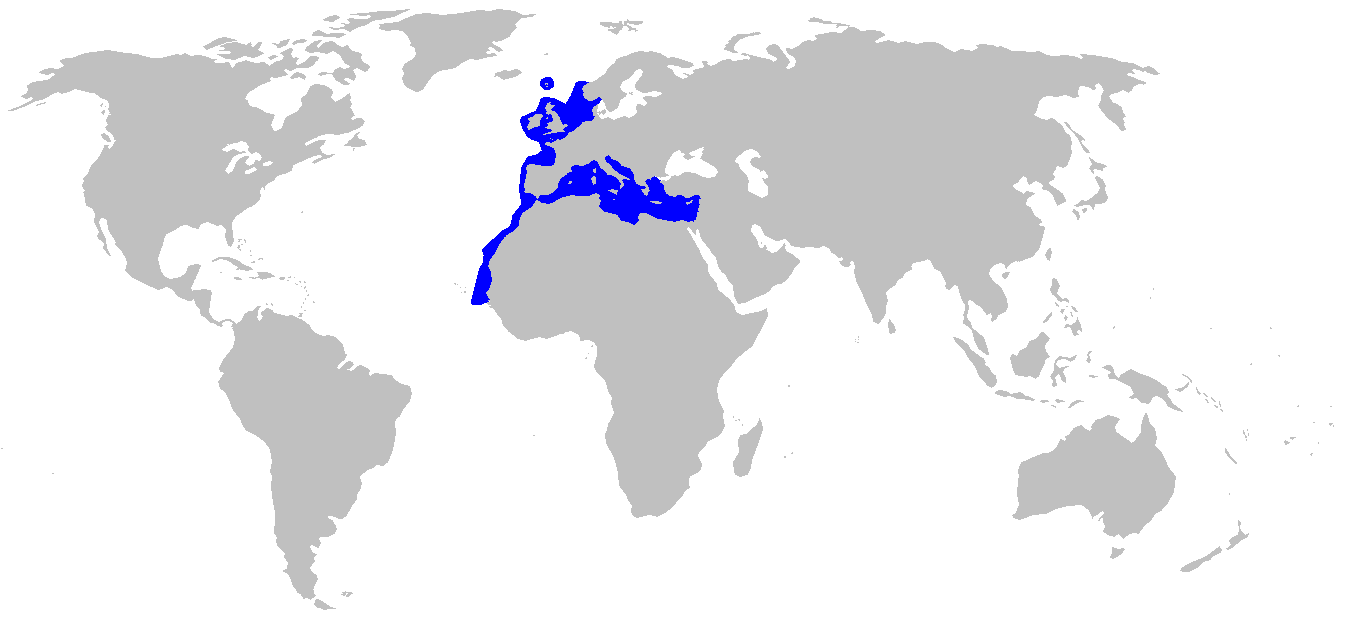
- Range of the blackmouth catshark

Synonyms
- Pristiurus melanostomus Lowe, 1843; Pristiurus souverbiei LaFont, 1868; Scyllium artedii Risso, 1820; Scyllium melanostomum Bonaparte, 1834; Squalus annulatus Nilsson, 1832; Squalus delarochianus* Blainville, 1816; Squalus prionurus Otto, 1821 * ambiguous synonym

= Blackmouth catshark =

Species of shark

The blackmouth catshark (Galeus melastomus) is a species of deepwater catshark, belonging to the family Pentanchidae, common in the northeastern Atlantic Ocean from Iceland to Senegal, including the Mediterranean Sea. It is typically found over the continental slope at depths of 150–1,400 m (490–4,590 ft), on or near muddy bottoms. The youngest sharks generally inhabit shallower water than the older juveniles and adults. This slim-bodied species is characterized by the black interior of its mouth, a marbled pattern of pale-edged brownish saddles or blotches along its back and tail, and a prominent saw-toothed crest of enlarged dermal denticles along the upper edge of its caudal fin. It reaches lengths of 50–79 cm (20–31 in), with sharks in the Atlantic growing larger than those in the Mediterranean.

Slow-swimming but active, the blackmouth catshark is a generalist that preys on a wide variety of crustaceans, cephalopods, and fishes. Its visual and electroreceptive systems are adept at tracking moving, bioluminescent prey. This species is oviparous, with females producing batches of up to 13 egg cases throughout the year. Because of its abundance, the blackmouth catshark forms a substantial part of the bycatch of deepwater commercial fisheries across much of its range. It has low economic value and is usually discarded, though the largest sharks may be marketed for meat and leather. The International Union for Conservation of Nature (IUCN) has listed this species under Least Concern, as there is no indication that its numbers have declined despite fishing pressure.

== Taxonomy and phylogeny ==
Constantine Samuel Rafinesque briefly described the blackmouth catshark in his 1810 Caratteri di alcuni nuovi generi e nuove specie di animali e piante della Sicilia: con varie osservazioni sopra i medesimi, wherein he referenced the distinctive black interior of its mouth (from which the specific epithet melastomus is derived). No type specimen was designated. This species may also be called the black-mouthed dogfish. A 2005 phylogenetic analysis that included five Galeus species, based on mitochondrial and nuclear DNA, found that G. melastomus forms a clade with G. murinus, apart from the clade of G. eastmani, G. gracilis, and G. sauteri. The oldest documented blackmouth catshark fossils come from the northern Apennines and date to the Lower Pliocene (5.3–3.6 Ma).

== Distribution and habitat ==
The blackmouth catshark is widely distributed in the northeastern Atlantic Ocean, from southwestern Iceland and Trondheim, Norway southward to Senegal, including the Faroe Islands, the British Isles, the Azores, and the northern portion of the Mid-Atlantic Ridge. It occurs throughout the Mediterranean Sea, save for the northern waters of the Adriatic and Aegean Seas, and is absent from the Black Sea. This species primarily inhabits the continental slope, at depths of 150–1,400 m (490–4,590 ft). However, it has been documented from water as shallow as 20–25 m (66–82 ft) in Norway, and as deep as 2,300–3,850 m (7,550–12,630 ft) in the eastern Mediterranean. The depths at which it is most common vary between regions, for example 300–500 m (980–1,640 ft) in the Bay of Biscay, 400–800 m (1,300–2,600 ft) off Portugal, 500–800 m (1,600–2,600 ft) in the Strait of Sicily, 1,000–1,400 m (3,300–4,600 ft) in the Catalan Sea, and 1,500–1,830 m (4,920–6,000 ft) in the eastern Mediterranean. Water temperature does not appear to be an important factor in determining the distribution of this species.

Found on or near the bottom, the blackmouth catshark favors a muddy habitat. There is little evidence for segregation by sex. A number of studies in the northern and western Mediterranean have reported that adults occur deeper than juveniles. Other studies though have found no such pattern. It is possible that areas such as the waters off southern France offer a habitat suitable for sharks of all ages. Another explanation with some scientific support is that adults are most common at intermediate depths, while young sharks are restricted to shallower water and both adults and juveniles are found in deeper water. If true, the age-depth inconsistencies observed from previous research could have resulted from incomplete depth sampling.

== Description ==
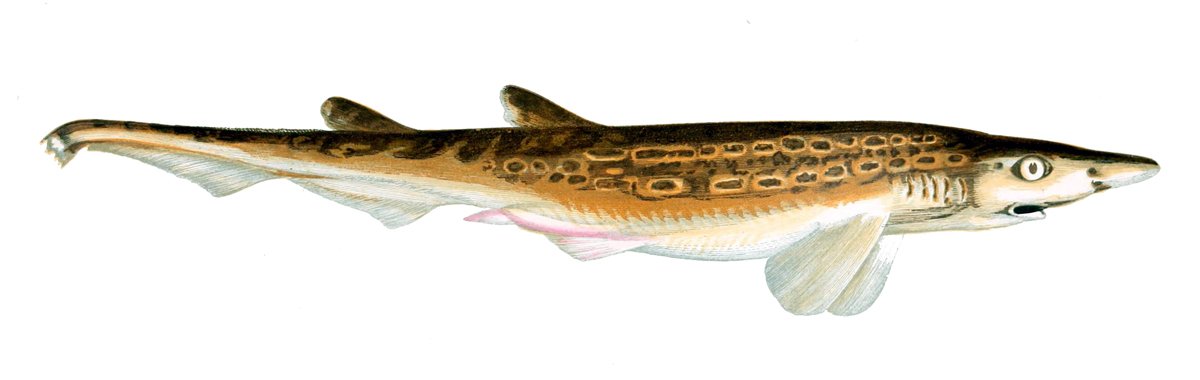
Early illustration of a blackmouth catshark, showing its ornate dorsal color pattern.

The reported maximum lengths attained by the blackmouth catshark varies from 67 to 79 cm (26 to 31 in) for Atlantic sharks and 50 to 64 cm (20 to 25 in) for Mediterranean sharks; a length record of 90 cm (35 in) may be dubious. Females attain a larger ultimate size than males. The maximum weight on record is 1.4 kg (3.1 lb). This species has a slender, firm body with a rather long, pointed snout comprising roughly 6–9% of the total length. The anterior rim of each nostril bears a large triangular flap, which divides the nostril into incurrent and excurrent openings. The eyes are horizontally oval and equipped with rudimentary nictitating membranes (protective third eyelids). Beneath each eye is a subtle ridge, and behind is a small spiracle. The mouth forms a short, wide arch, and bears moderately long furrows around the corners. The upper and lower jaws contain around 69 and 79 tooth rows respectively. Each tooth is small, with a narrow central cusp flanked by one or two smaller cusplets on either side. There are five pairs of gill slits, with the fifth pair over the pectoral fin bases.

The two dorsal fins are roughly equal in size and placed far back on the body: the first originates behind the midpoint of the pelvic fin bases and the second behind the midpoint of the anal fin base. The pectoral fins are large, while the pelvic fins are small and low, with angular margins. The anal fin is much larger than either dorsal fin; its base measures 13–18% of the total length and greatly exceeds the distance between the pelvic and anal fins, or between the dorsal fins. The caudal peduncle is laterally compressed, with the end of the anal fin very close to the caudal fin. The caudal fin comprises around a quarter of the total length; the upper lobe is low with a ventral notch near the tip, while the lower lobe is indistinct. The skin is very thick and covered by well-calcified dermal denticles. There is a prominent row of enlarged denticles, resembling saw teeth, along the upper edge of the caudal fin. The body is grayish-brown above, with 15–18 dark, rounded saddles, blotches, and/or spots that run onto the tail; each marking is highlighted by a paler border. The underside is white, as are the tips of the dorsal and caudal fins. The inside of the mouth is black.

== Biology and ecology ==
Within its range, the blackmouth catshark is one of the most abundant sharks over the upper and middle continental slope. It is nomadic in nature and may be found alone or in groups. Relatively slow, this shark swims with strong eel-like (anguilliform) undulations of its body. It often cruises just above the sea floor, perhaps taking advantage of the ground effect (a reduction in the drag on a wing when close to the ground) to save energy. It has also been seen resting motionless on the bottom. Known predators of the blackmouth catshark include the kitefin shark (Dalatias licha) and the European flying squid (Todarodes sagittatus). Parasites that have been documented from this species include the tapeworm Ditrachybothridium macrocephalum and the protist Eimeria palavensis.

=== Feeding ===
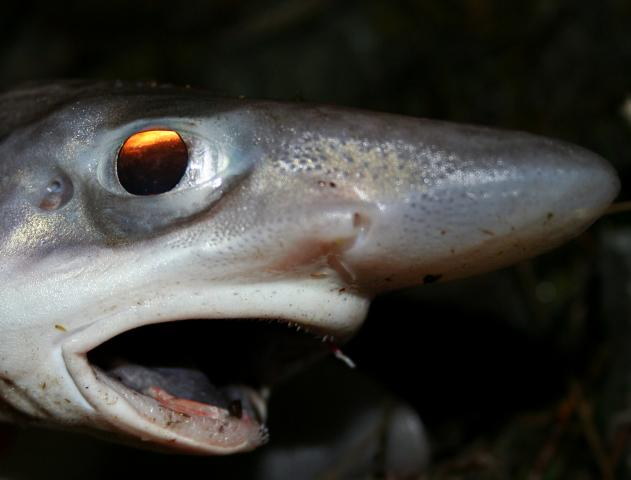
The blackmouth catshark has well-developed eyes and ampullae of Lorenzini for finding prey.

The blackmouth catshark is an active, generalist predator that feeds on both bottom-dwelling and free-swimming organisms. Its diet is dominated by decapods, krill, bony fishes (including lanternfishes, bristlemouths, dragonfishes, and moras), and cephalopods. The most significant prey species generally reflect what is most available in the environment, for example the shrimps Calocaris macandreae and Pasiphaea multidentata off southern France and the prawns Sergestes arcticus and Sergia robusta off the Iberian Peninsula. Juveniles consume a greater amount and variety of crustaceans than adults, including smaller types such as mysids and hyperiid amphipods. Adults favor relatively large fish prey and have been known to take other sharks and rays and smaller members of the same species. The importance of cephalopod prey across ages differs between regions. The stomachs of some blackmouth catsharks have found to contain pieces of animals too large for a single shark to overwhelm, suggesting that it may sometimes attack in groups. Scavenging has been infrequently documented, including of human refuse.

When foraging, the blackmouth catshark swings its head from side to side to employ its senses more effectively. It likely relies mainly on vision and electroreception to find food, and less on smell. As in most sharks, its visual acuity is greatest along the median horizontal plane. The lens and cone cells of its eyes are large, allowing smaller or farther objects to be discerned from the background. The rod cells of its eyes are most sensitive to the wavelengths emitted by bioluminescence, which is exhibited by most of the organisms it hunts. For electroreception, the blackmouth catshark has a high number of ampullae of Lorenzini that are evenly arranged, which enhances spatial resolution and is best suited for localizing fast-moving prey.

=== Life history ===
Unlike most members of its genus, the blackmouth catshark exhibits multiple oviparity, in which more than one egg can mature within each oviduct simultaneously. Females may contain up to 13 developing eggs, though 1–4 per oviduct is typical. The number of eggs laid annually per female has been estimated at between 60 and 100, increasing with female size. Only the right ovary is functional in mature females. The egg case is vase-shaped and bears a slight flange along the lateral margins; the anterior end is squared off, with a pair of stubby, coiled horns at the corners, while the posterior end is rounded. The surface of the case is somewhat translucent, smooth, and glossy. The case is a golden brown color when first laid, and becomes dark brown in sea water. Egg cases produced by Atlantic sharks measure 3.5–6.5 cm (1.4–2.6 in) long and 1.4–3.0 cm (0.55–1.18 in) across. Those produced by Mediterranean sharks tend to be smaller at 4.2–5.5 cm (1.7–2.2 in) long and 1.7–2.5 cm (0.67–0.98 in) across. Larger females produce slightly larger egg cases.

Mating and egg-laying proceeds year-round; reproductive activity is highest in winter and summer, though not all studies have found such a seasonal pattern. The eggs are deposited on muddy substrates in relatively shallow water. Maturation size varies between geographical regions, and is generally larger in the Atlantic than in the Mediterranean. Lengths at maturity for males and females have been variously reported from 48 to 79 cm (19 to 31 in) and 56 to 79 cm (22 to 31 in) respectively in the Atlantic, and from 42 to 55 cm (17 to 22 in) and 39 to 61 cm (15 to 24 in) respectively in the Mediterranean.

== Human interactions ==
Harmless to humans and of little economic value, the blackmouth catshark is caught incidentally in large numbers by commercial bottom trawl and longline fisheries. In particular, it is among the most commonly bycaught sharks in trawls targeting deepwater lobsters and shrimps (Nephrops norvegicus, Parapenaeus longirostris, Aristeus antennatus, and Aristaeomorpha folicea), operating off Portugal and in the Mediterranean. Most captured sharks are discarded, probably with heavy mortality. Some fisheries, such as those off Portugal and Italy, retain and utilize a small subset of the largest individuals for human consumption fresh or dried and salted, and for leather; the fishing fleet of Viareggio, Tuscany reported landing 700 kg (1,500 lb) in 2005. In the northeastern Atlantic, this shark is being increasingly targeted by fishers following the decline of other deepwater shark species.

Off Corsica, Sicily, and southern Portugal, and in the Ionian, southern Adriatic, and Aegean Seas, most of the blackmouth catsharks captured are immature, suggesting there has been a negative impact of fishing pressure. However, the species remains extremely abundant in a number of areas, and survey and fishery data have not shown any evidence of overall population decline. The wide range of depths it occupies likely afford it some protection against fishing, particularly given a 2005 ban on trawling deeper than 1,000 m (3,300 ft) in the Mediterranean. Therefore, the International Union for Conservation of Nature (IUCN) has listed the blackmouth catshark under Least Concern. In the waters of the European Commission, fishing for this species is managed as part of the Total Allowable Catch (TAC) for deepwater sharks.
