= Stewart Springer =

- Born: June 5, 1906
- Died: August 23, 1991 (aged 85)
- Education: Butler University, George Washington University
- Known for: Shark behavior and taxonomy
- Scientific career
- Fields: Ichthyology, herpetology
- Institutions: U.S. Fish & Wildlife Service, Bureau of Commercial Fisheries, Stanford University, Mote Marine Laboratory, National Marine Fisheries Service

Stewart Springer (5 June 1906 – 23 August 1991) was an American ichthyologist and herpetologist. He was an expert on shark behavior, classification (taxonomy), and population distribution. More than 35 species of sharks, skates, rays, and other creatures are either classified by or named after him.

== Early life and education ==
Springer initially studied at Butler University but left in 1929 before completing a degree. His early interest in animal behavior began in the 1920s when he identified and described the plateau striped whiptail lizard (Aspidoscelis velox) during a field trip in Arizona. His interest in the whiptail was piqued, he said, by the fact that he was chaperoning a field trip with the Cottonwood Gulch Foundation in Arizona in 1928. His young team of Boy Scouts could catch jack rabbits and other lizards in the area, but could not catch this particular lizard.

In 1964, after more than three decades of fieldwork and scientific contributions, he earned a baccalaureate degree in biological sciences from George Washington University.

== Career ==
=== Early research ===
Springer's focus shifted from reptiles to sharks in the late 1920s. Moving to Biloxi, Mississippi, he began studying shark populations while working to supply specimens for zoological study. His observations on the segregation of male and female sharks by habitat contributed to early knowledge of shark life history patterns.

=== Government and fisheries work ===
From the 1940s through the early 1970s, Springer worked for U.S. government agencies on shark biology and fisheries research. During World War II, he assisted the Office of Strategic Services in developing shark repellent and survival manuals for the United States Navy.

From 1950 to 1971, Springer worked for the U.S. Fish & Wildlife Service, Bureau of Commercial Fisheries, Department of the Interior, as a fishery methods and equipment specialist while continuing his research in the life history and behavior of sharks. From 1955 to 1962, he served as Chief of the Branch of Exploratory Fishing at the Bureau of Commercial Fisheries.

In the 1960s, Springer conducted shark-tagging research as a fishery biologist at Stanford University. He retired from federal service in 1971 but continued his research at the Mote Marine Laboratory in Florida. In April 1979, he completed his last major research project with publication by the National Marine Fisheries Service of "A Revision of the Catsharks, Family Scyliorhinidae." This paper covered a family of sharks that included (in 1979) 86 species and 17 genera. Six new species and one new subspecies were described in this publication

From 1968 to 1971, Springer served as a fishery biologist at the National Marine Fisheries Service.

== See also ==
- Category:Taxa named by Stewart Springer

== Legacy ==
- The broadnose wedgefish Rhynchobatus springeri is named after him.
