= Gill slit =

Individual opening to a gill

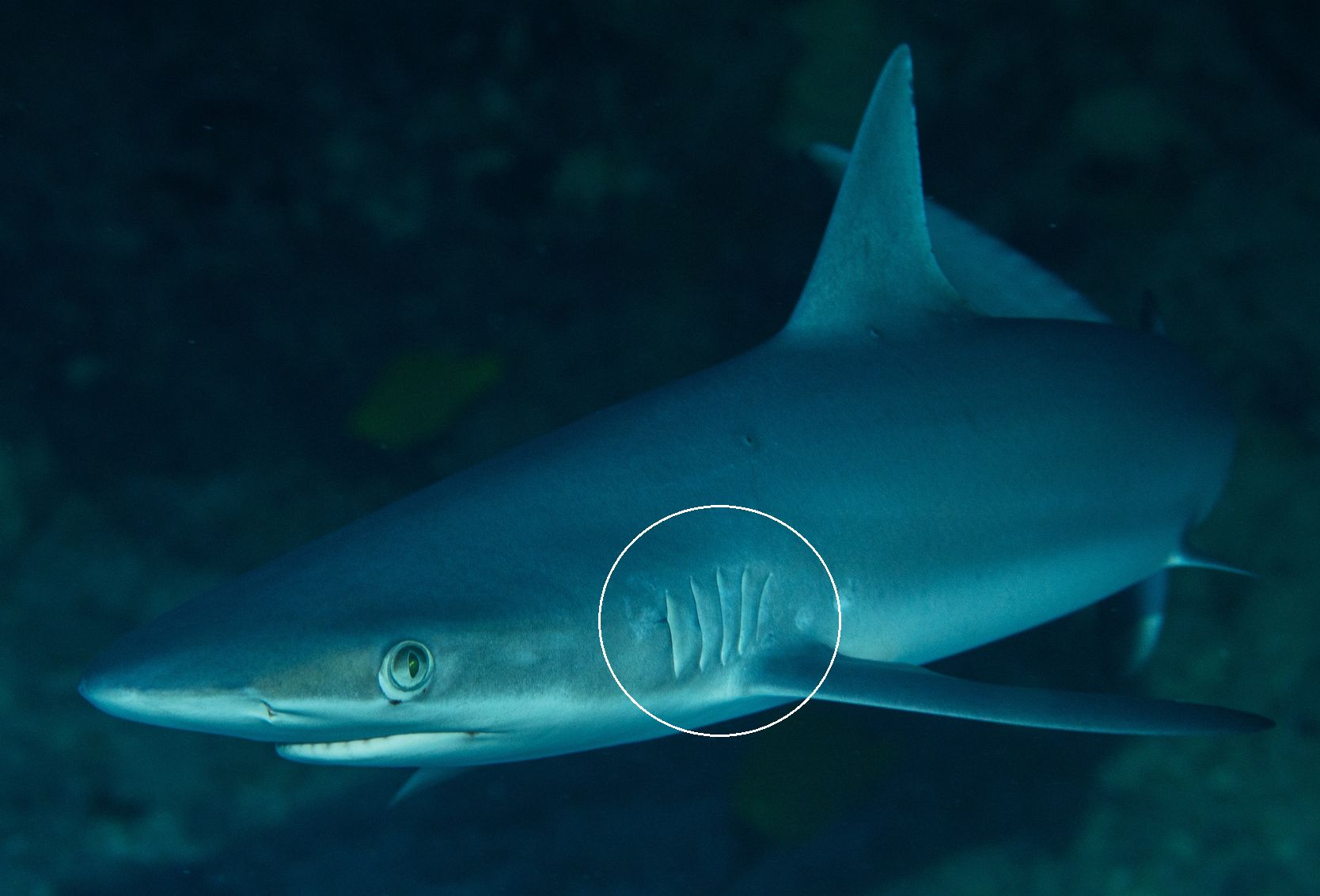
Gill slits on a grey reef shark

4 = Gill slits on a lamprey

Gill slits are individual openings to gills, i.e., multiple gill arches, which lack a single outer cover. Such gills are characteristic of cartilaginous fish such as sharks and rays, as well as deep-branching vertebrates such as lampreys. In contrast, bony fishes have a single outer bony gill covering called an operculum.

Most sharks and rays have five pairs of gill slits, but a few species have 6 or 7 pairs. Shark gill slits lie in a row behind the head. The anterior edge of a gill slit is motile, moving outward to allow water to exit, but closing to prevent reverse flow. A modified slit, called a spiracle, lies just behind the eye, which assists the shark with taking in water during respiration and plays a major role in bottom–dwelling sharks. Spiracles are reduced or missing in active pelagic sharks. While the shark is moving, water passes through the mouth and over the gills in a process known as "ram ventilation". While at rest, most sharks pump water over their gills to ensure a constant supply of oxygenated water. A small number of species have lost the ability to pump water through their gills and must swim without rest. These species are obligate ram ventilators and would presumably asphyxiate if unable to move. Obligate ram ventilation is also true of some pelagic bony fish species.

The true gill slits in embryonic fish develop into fish gills. However, the slits in tetrapods do not, so a more general name for the vertebral structures is pharyngeal slits. Gill slits likely originated from pharyngeal slits (as found in tunicates) that were used for filter-feeding. The term "gill slits" has also been used to refer to the folds of skin in the pharyngeal region in embryos. It is now accepted that it is the vertebrate pharyngeal pouches and not the neck slits that are homologous to the pharyngeal slits of invertebrate chordates.

== See also ==
- External gills
- Gill raker
- Operculum (fish)
- Pharyngeal slit
