= Sulu gollumshark =

Conservation status
- Least Concern (IUCN 3.1)

Scientific classification
- Kingdom: Animalia
- Phylum: Chordata
- Class: Chondrichthyes
- Subclass: Elasmobranchii
- Division: Selachii
- Order: Carcharhiniformes
- Family: Pseudotriakidae
- Genus: Gollum
- Species: G. suluensis

Binomial name
- Gollum suluensis Last & Gaudiano, 2011

Gollum suluensis

The Sulu gollumshark (Gollum suluensis) is a species of ground shark in the family Pseudotriakidae, found off Palawan Island in the southern Philippines. This recently discovered species was discovered at a fish market in Palawan during a project led by the World Wildlife Fund during the 1990s to investigate elasmobranch biodiversity in the area.

The Sulu gollumshark derives its name from the Sulu Sea in the Philippines. They can grow to sizes of 58.5 cm (1.92 ft) in length, and feature darker coloration and a wider head relative to the closely related slender smooth-hound, another species of gollumshark.
