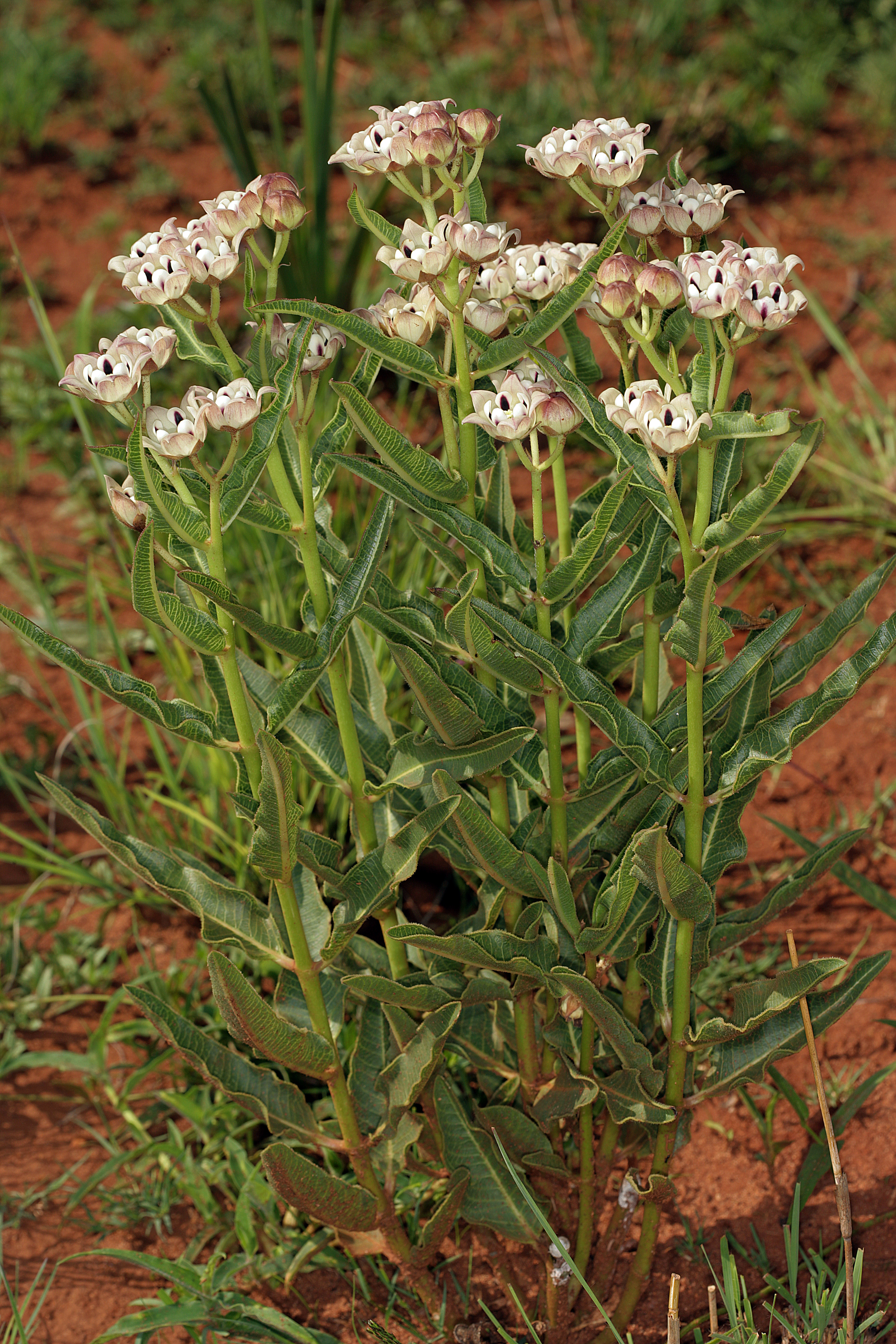
- Pachycarpus schinzianus

Scientific classification
- Kingdom: Plantae
- Clade: Embryophytes
- Clade: Tracheophytes
- Clade: Spermatophytes
- Clade: Angiosperms
- Clade: Eudicots
- Clade: Asterids
- Order: Gentianales
- Family: Apocynaceae
- Subfamily: Asclepiadoideae
- Tribe: Asclepiadeae
- Genus: Pachycarpus; E.Mey.

= Pachycarpus =

Genus of African flowering plants

Pachycarpus is a genus of plants in the family Apocynaceae, first described in 1838. It is native to Africa.

Species

1. Pachycarpus appendiculatus E.Mey. - South Africa
2. Pachycarpus asperifolius Meisn. - South Africa
3. Pachycarpus bisacculatus (Oliv.) Goyder - Tanzania
4. Pachycarpus campanulatus (Harv.) N.E.Br. - South Africa
5. Pachycarpus concolor E.Mey. - South Africa
6. Pachycarpus coronarius E.Mey. - South Africa
7. Pachycarpus dealbatus E.Mey. - South Africa
8. Pachycarpus decorus N.E.Br. - South Africa
9. Pachycarpus distinctus (N.E.Br.) Bullock - SE Africa
10. Pachycarpus eximius (Schltr.) Bullock - Rwenzori Mountains in Zaire + Uganda
11. Pachycarpus firmus (N.E.Br.) Goyder - Angola
12. Pachycarpus galpinii (Schltr.) N.E.Br. - South Africa
13. Pachycarpus gerrardii N.E.Br. - South Africa
14. Pachycarpus goetzei (K.Schum.) Bullock - Tanzania
15. Pachycarpus grandiflorus (R.Br.) E.Mey. - South Africa (given as (L.f.) E.Mey in The Plant List, but this is in error; basionym is Xysmalobium grandiflorum R.Br. 1810, not the Mexican species Asclepias grandiflora L.f.)
16. Pachycarpus grantii (Oliv.) Bullock - E Africa
17. Pachycarpus inconstans N.E. Br. - South Africa
18. Pachycarpus insignis N.E. Br. - South Africa
19. Pachycarpus lebomboensis D.M.N. Sm. - KwaZulu-Natal
20. Pachycarpus linearis N.E. Br. - South Africa
21. Pachycarpus lineolatus (Decne.) Bullock - Angola
22. Pachycarpus mackenii N.E. Br. - South Africa
23. Pachycarpus macrochilus N.E. Br. - South Africa
24. Pachycarpus medusonema Bullock - Cameroon
25. Pachycarpus natalensis N.E. Br. - KwaZulu-Natal
26. Pachycarpus petherickianus (Oliv.) Goyder - NE Africa
27. Pachycarpus plicatus N.E. Br. - South Africa
28. Pachycarpus reflectens E. Mey. - South Africa
29. Pachycarpus rhinophyllus (K. Schum.) N.E. Br. - E + S Africa
30. Pachycarpus rigidus E.Mey. ex Eckl. & Zeyh. - South Africa
31. Pachycarpus robustus (A. Rich.) Bullock - Ethiopia
32. Pachycarpus rostratus N.E. Br. - South Africa
33. Pachycarpus scaber (Harv.) N.E. Br. - South Africa
34. Pachycarpus schinzianus (Schltr.) N.E. Br. - South Africa
35. Pachycarpus schweinfurthii (N.E.Br.) Bullock - C Africa
36. Pachycarpus spurius (N.E. Br.) Bullock - Zambia
37. Pachycarpus stelliceps N.E. Br. - South Africa
38. Pachycarpus stenoglossus N.E. Br. - South Africa
39. Pachycarpus suaveolens (Schltr.) Nicholas & Goyder - South Africa
40. Pachycarpus transvaalensis (Schltr.) N.E. Br. - South Africa
41. Pachycarpus validus N.E. Br. - South Africa
42. Pachycarpus vexillaris E. Mey. - South Africa

formerly included

moved to other genera (Asclepias, Gomphocarpus, Xysmalobium)

1. P. albens now Asclepias albens
2. P. crispus now Asclepias crispa
3. P. fulvus now Asclepias fulva
4. P. gomphocarpoides now Asclepias gomphocarpoides
5. P. graminifolius now Asclepias graminifolia
6. P. humilis now Asclepias humilis
7. P. ligulatus now Xysmalobium ligulatum
8. P. marginatus now Gomphocarpus marginatus
9. P. orbicularis now Gomphocarpus orbicularis
10. P. viridiflorus now Asclepias fulva
