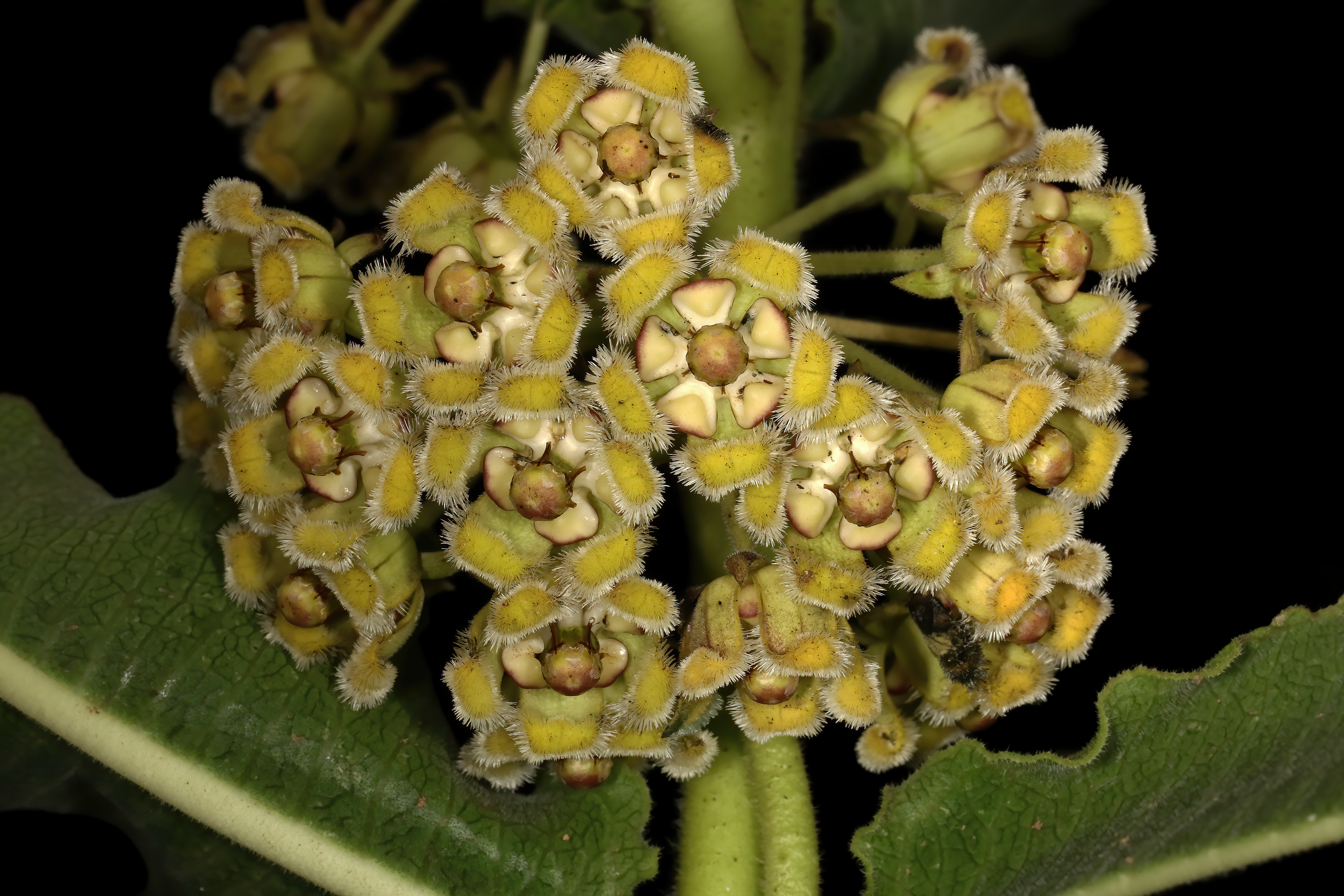
- Xysmalobium undulatum var. undulatum

Scientific classification
- Kingdom: Plantae
- Clade: Tracheophytes
- Clade: Angiosperms
- Clade: Eudicots
- Clade: Asterids
- Order: Gentianales
- Family: Apocynaceae
- Subfamily: Asclepiadoideae
- Tribe: Asclepiadeae
- Genus: Xysmalobium; R.Br.

Type species
- Xysmalobium undulatum (L.) W.T. Aiton.

Synonyms
- Pachyacris Schltr.

= Xysmalobium =

Genus of flowering plants

Xysmalobium is a genus of plants in the family Apocynaceae, first described as a genus in 1810. It is native to Africa.

Species

1. Xysmalobium acerateoides
2. Xysmalobium andongense
3. Xysmalobium asperum
4. Xysmalobium banjoense
5. Xysmalobium baurii
6. Xysmalobium brownianum
7. Xysmalobium carinatum
8. Xysmalobium clavatum
9. Xysmalobium confusum
10. Xysmalobium congoense
11. Xysmalobium decipiens
12. Xysmalobium fraternum
13. Xysmalobium gerrardii
14. Xysmalobium gomphocarpoides
15. Xysmalobium gossweileri
16. Xysmalobium gramineum
17. Xysmalobium heudelotianum
18. Xysmalobium holubii
19. Xysmalobium involucratum
20. Xysmalobium kaessneri
21. Xysmalobium ligulatum
22. Xysmalobium membraniferum
23. Xysmalobium obscurum
24. Xysmalobium orbiculare
25. Xysmalobium parviflorum
26. Xysmalobium patulum
27. Xysmalobium pearsonii
28. Xysmalobium prunelloides
29. Xysmalobium reticulatum
30. Xysmalobium rhodesianum
31. Xysmalobium rhomboideum
32. Xysmalobium samoritourei
33. Xysmalobium sessile
34. Xysmalobium stockenstromense
35. Xysmalobium stocksii
36. Xysmalobium tenue
37. Xysmalobium trauseldii
38. Xysmalobium tysonianum
39. Xysmalobium undulatum
40. Xysmalobium vexillare
41. Xysmalobium winterbergense
42. Xysmalobium woodii
43. Xysmalobium zeyheri

formerly included

moved to other genera (Asclepias, Glossostelma, Gomphocarpus, Pachycarpus)

1. X. albens, syn of Asclepias albens
2. X. appendiculatum, syn of Asclepias appendiculata
3. X. carsoni, syn of Glossostelma carsonii
4. X. cecilae, syn of Glossostelma ceciliae
5. X. concolor, syn of Asclepias concolor
6. X. coronarium, syn of Gomphocarpus coronarius
7. X. crispum, syn of Asclepias crispa
8. X. dealbatum, syn of Asclepias dealbata
9. X. grandiflorum, syn of Gomphocarpus grandiflorus
10. X. humile, syn of Asclepias humilis
11. X. marginatum, syn of Gomphocarpus marginatus
12. X. reflectens, syn of Asclepias reflectens
13. X. rigidum, syn of Pachycarpus rigidus
14. X. spurium, syn of Pachycarpus spurius
15. X. viridiflorum, syn of Asclepias fulva
