= Pygmy false catshark =

Scientific classification
- Kingdom: Animalia
- Phylum: Chordata
- Class: Chondrichthyes
- Subclass: Elasmobranchii
- Division: Selachii
- Order: Carcharhiniformes
- Family: Pseudotriakidae
- Genus: Planonasus
- Species: P. indicus

Binomial name
- Planonasus indicus Ebert, Akhilesh & Weigmann, 2018

Species of fish

The pygmy false catshark (Planonasus indicus), also known as the eastern dwarf false catshark, is a species of ground shark, which lives in the Indian Ocean near Kochi, Kerala and off Sri Lanka. This species is one of two known members of its genus, the other being the dwarf false catshark which also lives in the Indian Ocean, but near Socotra. This had prior been an uncategorized species, but was recognized as a new species in 2019.
