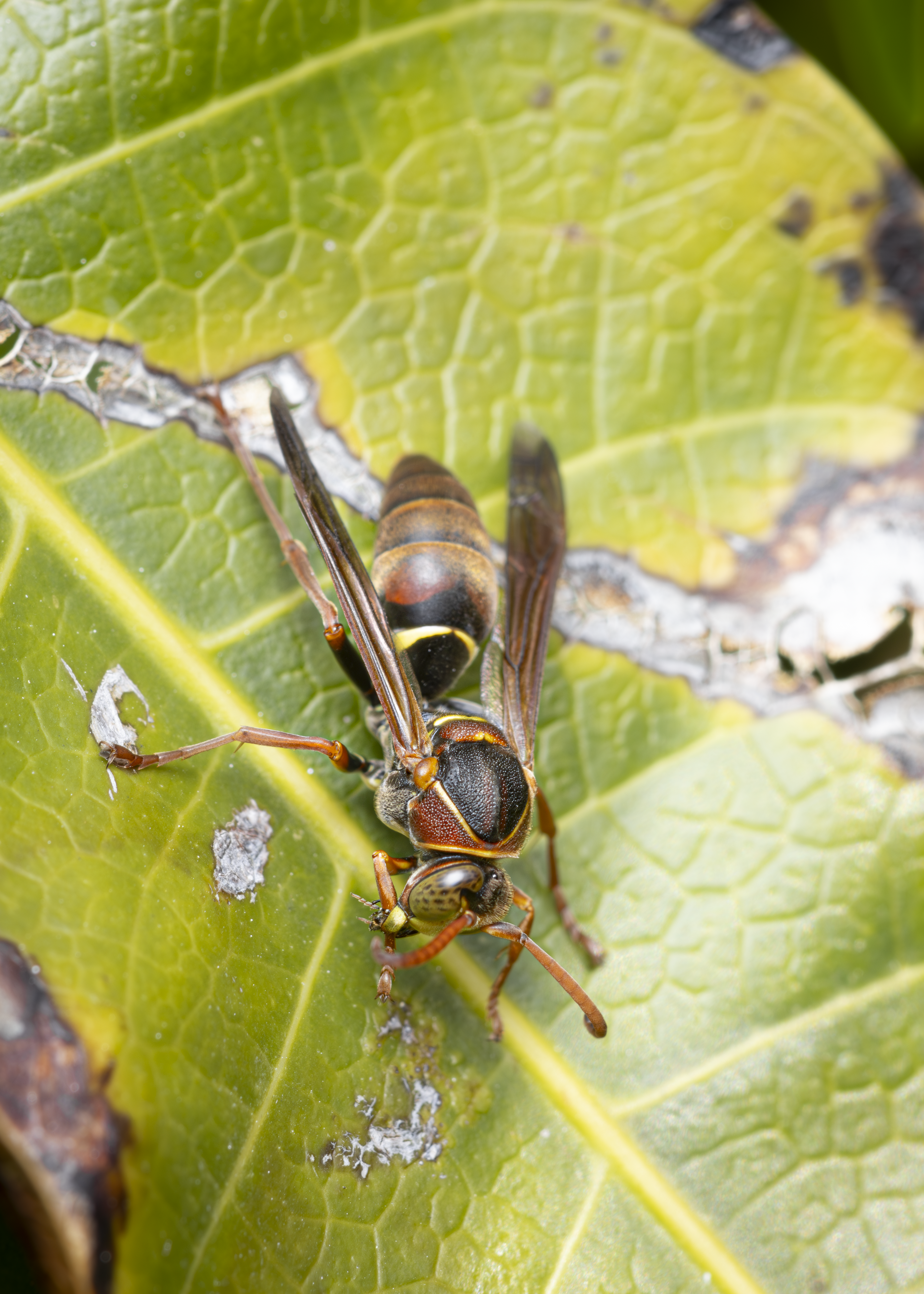

Conservation status
- Least Concern (IUCN 3.1)

Scientific classification
- Kingdom: Animalia
- Phylum: Arthropoda
- Clade: Pancrustacea
- Class: Insecta
- Order: Hymenoptera
- Family: Vespidae
- Genus: Polistes
- Species: P. humilis

Binomial name
- Polistes humilis Fabricius

Subspecies
- Polistes humilis humilis; Polistes humilis synoecus
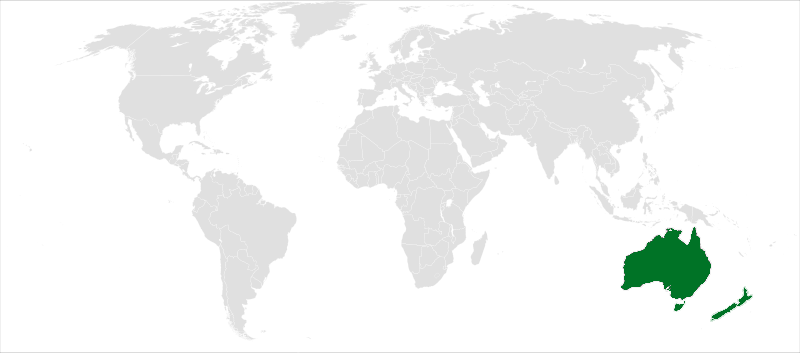
- Distribution of Polistis humilis

= Polistes humilis =

Species of wasp

Polistes humilis, known as the Australian paper wasp, is a species of wasp in the family Vespidae that is found throughout Australia and which has been introduced to northern New Zealand. These paper wasps can be identified by their long thin legs and banded yellow and black coloring. They have been known to re-utilize old nests. While the species does not exhibit morphological class differences, there are distinct behavioral differences between queens and workers. In addition, the species is eusocial and benefits from relatedness between individuals. They are known for delivering a painful sting, especially when their nest is disturbed, a behavior that has been developed as a nest defense mechanism. While wasps are often viewed negatively, they play an important pollination role for many plants.

== Taxonomy and phylogeny ==
Polistes humilis is in the genus Polistes, which consists of 150 species that can be found in all regions except the world's coldest climates. Polistes humilis was the only species of the tribe Polistini found in New Zealand after it was accidentally introduced from Australia, prior to the introduction of the Asian paper wasp, Polistes chinensis in 1979. There are 11 different Polistes species found in Australia, and the Polistes humilis is the most prevalent one. Historically, Polistes variabilis has often been misidentified as a sub-species of Polistes humilis. But, recent photogenic analysis has indicated that these are two separate species. The species can be divided into two subspecies, P. humilis humilis which is found in northern Australia and P.humilis synoeus which can be found in the south.

== Description and identification ==
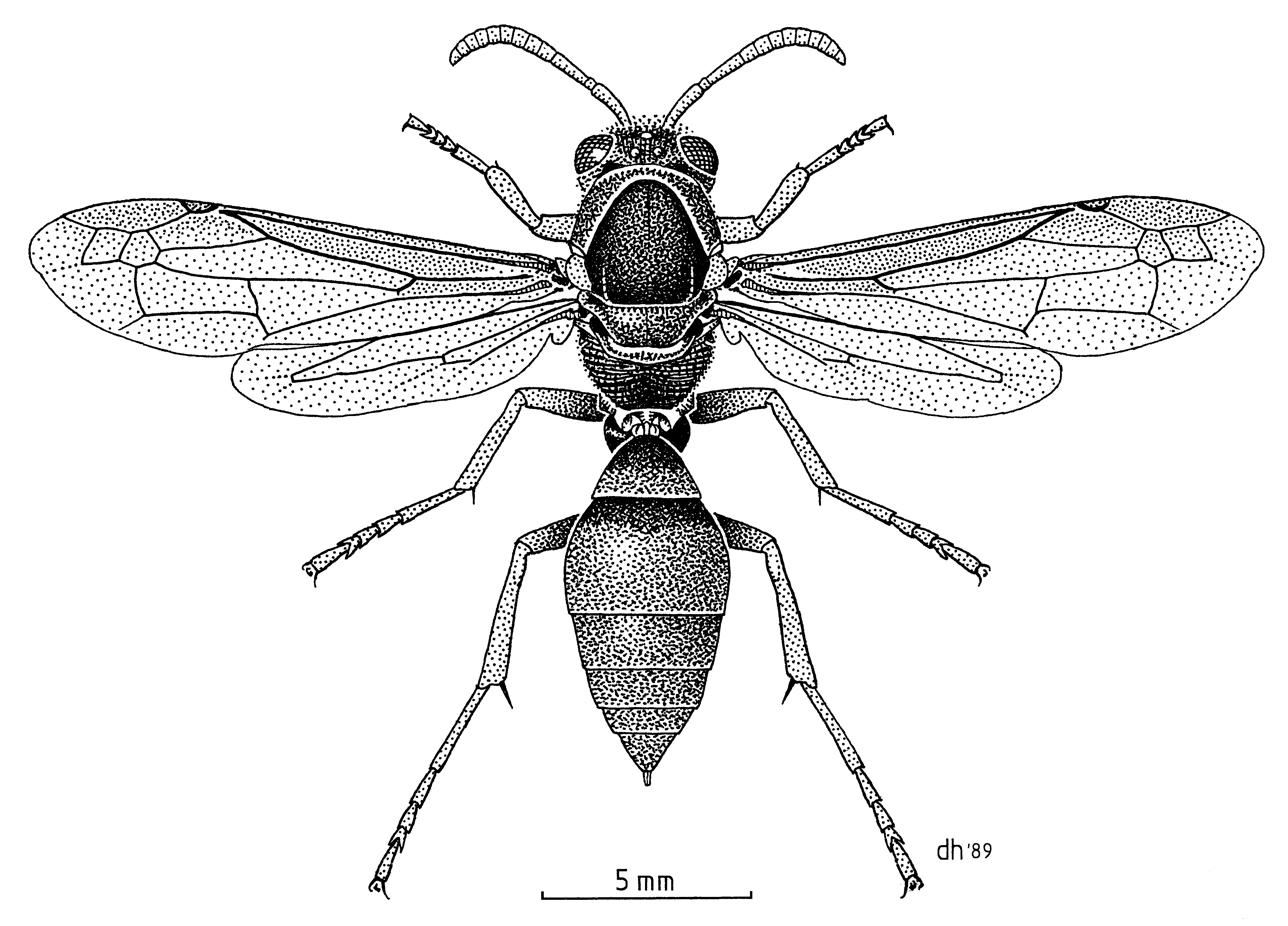
Polistes humilis, female, illustrated by Des Helmore

This species of wasp can be identified by its slender body structure and banded coloring. Adults have yellow faces and are 10–15mm long with a tannish-red coloration. Males can be distinguished from females by a yellow marking on the abdomen area. In addition, Polistes humilis are generally bigger than most other paper wasps. Nests of this species can be identified by their cone shaped appearance with multiple hexagonal cells. The species builds its nest out of grey wood fiber material, which is a mixture of its own saliva and wood. Unlike most species of wasps, Polistes humilis colonies have been known to re-utilize old nests from year to year. Some colonies overwinter and shelter above the comb in colder months.

== Distribution and habitat ==
Polistes humilis is mostly found in Australia, particularly in southern Queensland, New South Wales, Victoria, and South Australia. While this species is native to Australia, the species was accidentally introduced to New Zealand in the 1880s and has established a stable population in that country, largely confined to the North Island north of Tauranga and west of Te Kuiti. Environmentally, the highest abundance of P. humilis can be found in shrublands. However, the species can also be found in flax swamps and forest sites.

== Colony cycle ==
The colony cycle of Polistes humilis starts in the spring and can begin in three ways. Firstly, the colony cycle can begin with the founding of a new nest, typically by several foundresses. Secondly, the cycle can start with the re-utilization of an old nest, which can be several years old. Thirdly, the cycle can also begin with the continued use of an old nest as this species can overwinter. In situations where old nests are used, new eggs are typically laid around the old cells.

Throughout the year, production of Polistes humilis nests typically follow a distinctive cycle. In the spring, nests are founded by females that have overwintered and have been previously inseminated. After founding, worker females are produced in the late spring and early summer. Males and queen females are produced in the late summer and early autumn.

== Behavior ==
=== Dominance hierarchy ===
In Polistes humilis nests, there is an observable hierarchy between reproducing queens and sterile workers. There are no outward physical differences between females; even small females have been known to produce eggs. Since there are no morphological differences between females, behavioral characteristics are the primary determinate of whether a female reproduces or not. These females can be determined by observation as they often receive solid food, honey, and water from worker females returning from foraging. Dominance is often displayed by a "tail wagging" behavior of the lower segment of the species. However, unlike most species that use behavioral characteristics to determine reproductive success, Polistes humilis does not exhibit high competition between females within the nest. This is likely due to the high degree of relatedness among nestmates.

=== Mating behavior ===
Polistes humilis queens are singly mated, meaning that the eggs of the queen are fertilized by a single male and only one fertilization event occurs per female. However, within each colony, there are an average of two queens. This multiple queen behavior likely developed as a defense mechanism for the nest. Since different males can fertilize each female in the nest, genetic diversity is increased within the nest, which can help defend against disease. In addition, a distinctive characteristic of this species is that there is no inbreeding within P. humilis colonies. This suggests that dispersal is primarily male based and that males do not reproduce in their native colony. Dispersal of males likely happens before mating.

== Kin selection ==
=== Genetic relatedness within colonies ===
Polistes humilis are a haplodiploid species, with females developing from a fertilized egg and males developing from an unfertilized egg. In this system, queens are singly mated with full sisters sharing the paternal genetic information and either one of the maternal alleles. Therefore, sisters that share the same mother are 75% related in accordance with the haplodiploidy hypothesis. However, this ratio is skewed, making siblings less related, by having multiple queens in a nest. While this might benefit disease defense, skewing the relatedness ratio could disrupt the fragile eusocial behavior within the nest as some females within the nest are more related than others.

=== Costs and benefits of sociality ===
In Polistes humilis there are distinct benefits to having larger nest sizes. As nest size increases, the number of reproducing females directly increases. On one hand, this decreases the genetic relatedness of individuals and could cause a breakdown of the dominance hierarchy of the nest as it increases the gene pool of the nest. This correlation likely evolved as a defense against disease transmission, as increased genetic variability has been shown to reduce disease transmission within nests and could prevent a nest from dying out. On the other hand, as nests get larger, there are increased numbers of individuals and therefore increased nest defense. For this reason, larger nests have better defense against predators and human intervention.

=== Worker queen conflict ===
Since queen females have few morphological differences from worker females, they must use behavioral means to prevent them from laying eggs. As each queen selfishly wants to have as many offspring as possible, it is likely that oophagy occurs in Polistes humilis. This practice limits the eggs that weaker females can produce and reduces the genetic variability of the nest. Dominance of females can also be established through behavioral displays. Dominant females display their dominance by horizontal vibrations of the gaster and by mounting and wrestling with other females. These behaviors help the queens maximize their offspring's ability to survive and increases the genetic relatedness within the nest.

== Interactions with other species ==
=== Diet ===
Polistes humilis are observed to subsist on food brought back to the nest by worker wasps. Once food is brought back to the nest, workers distribute the food to the queen and larvae. The species consumes primarily water, pulp, carbohydrate and protein prey. In southern Australia, Polistes humilis appears to specialize in consuming lepidopteran larvae for protein as well as small spiders. Polistes humilis has to compete with other species for food, particularly the newly introduced, invasive species Vespula germanica. While Polistes humilis is very common now, competition for food could reduce its population in the future.

=== Defense against intruders ===
As a stinging wasp, Polistes humilis has a very powerful defense mechanism. The venom in the sting of the species helps with prey capture and nest defense from predators. The venom comes from the two tubular glands and is secreted by powerful muscles that coat the reservoir and squeeze out the venom. The venom is known to be used in fights between species and is often used in limited amounts. The venom is largely made of serotonin, histamine, tyramine, and dopamine which are all considered major pain producing components of the venom.

=== Defense against disease ===
Polistes humilis also has developed two defenses against disease: genetic diversity and the production of cuticular antimicrobial compounds. There is a trade-off between these mechanisms, with larger colony sizes having more genetic diversity and smaller colonies having increased antimicrobials. This trade-off has likely developed by evolution as the cuticular compounds are metabolically expensive to produce so larger colonies may not be able to support this mechanism. In successful colonies, these mechanisms work together, as shown by the Pc80 locus. Genetic analysis shows that increased variation at this locus is positively correlated with antimicrobial strength. However, as the success of these mechanisms is very important for colony survival, these mechanisms are important limiting factors for maximum colony threshold size. Since antimicrobial compounds in Polistes humilis are found in the species' venom and only females produce the sting venom, larger colonies with more males might have lower effectiveness of this mechanism. Group size and microbial defense are important characteristics to consider when determining disease susceptibility.

== Human importance ==
=== Nest location and stings ===
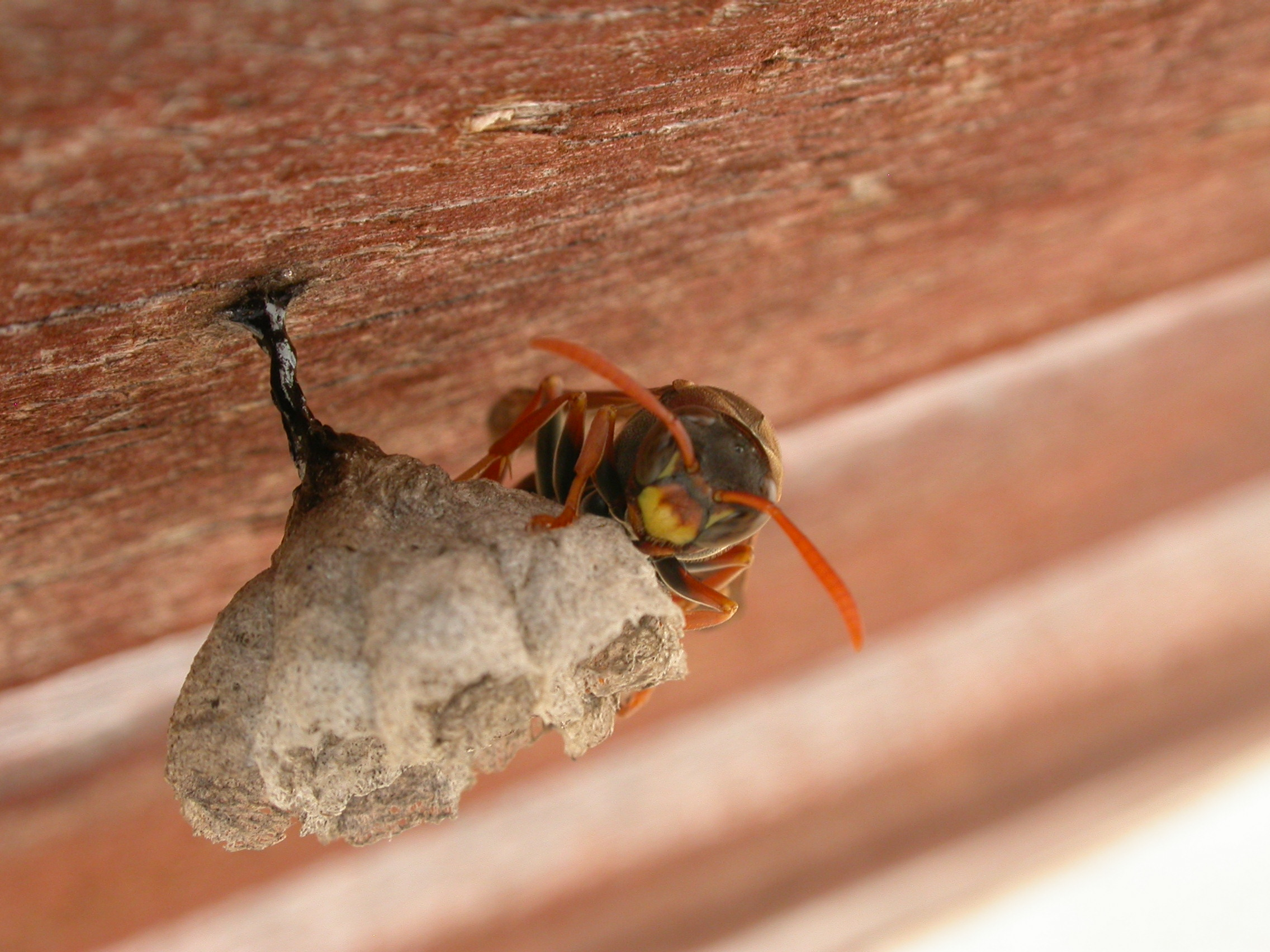
View of the nest with adult.

Polistes humilis is probably most known to humans by its painful sting. These stings often result from agitation of nest sites. Polistes humilis nests are often found in "modified habitats" where there is a mix of human structures and vegetation. Since nests are typically found in walls, eaves of buildings, and fences, humans are particularly at risk of accidentally disturbing a nest site. However, while the sting is very painful, humans are not at risk of serious injury from the sting unless they are allergic. The best way to avoid a sting is to simply stay away from known nest sites if possible, as these wasps typically only sting as a defense mechanism.

=== Agriculture ===
Polistes humilis are important to the overall ecosystem as pollinators. Since this species is one of the most populous species in Australia, it is responsible for the survival of many native wildlife. Polistes humilis appear to be widespread pollinators, not only in abundance but also in the species of plants pollinated. While this behavior is good for native plants, it has important implications for non-native species. The success of an introduced invasive species largely depends on the availability of pollinator relationships. Since Polistes humilis are general pollinators, they have been observed to contribute to the success of invasive species, such as the milkweeds Asclepias curassavica and Gomphocarpus fruticosus.
