= Dwarf false catshark =

Scientific classification
- Kingdom: Animalia
- Phylum: Chordata
- Class: Chondrichthyes
- Subclass: Elasmobranchii
- Division: Selachii
- Order: Carcharhiniformes
- Family: Pseudotriakidae
- Genus: Planonasus
- Species: P. parini

Binomial name
- Planonasus parini Weigmann, Stehmann & Thiel, 2013

Species of fish

The dwarf false catshark (Planonasus parini) is a species of ground shark, which lives in the Indian Ocean near Socotra. This species is one of two known members of its genus, the other being the pygmy false catshark off the coast of India, Sri Lanka, and the Maldives. The pygmy false catshark is very closely related to the dwarf false catshark, but has some morphological differences. Two examples are its absence of an oral papillae and that it has more tooth rows in the lower jaw.
