= Planonasus =

Scientific classification
- Kingdom: Animalia
- Phylum: Chordata
- Class: Chondrichthyes
- Subclass: Elasmobranchii
- Division: Selachii
- Order: Carcharhiniformes
- Family: Pseudotriakidae
- Genus: Planonasus; Weigmann, Stehmann & Thiel, 2013

Type species
- Planonasus parini Weigmann, Stehmann & Thiel, 2013

Genus of ground sharks

Planonasus is a genus of ground sharks in the family Pseudotriakidae, native to the western Indian Ocean.

== Species ==
There are currently two species in this genus:

- Planonasus parini (Weigmann, Stehmann & Thiel, 2013) (dwarf false catshark)
- Planonasus indicus (Ebert, Akhilesh, & Weigmann, 2018) (pygmy false catshark)
