= Hortus Romanus =

Book of botanical illustrations

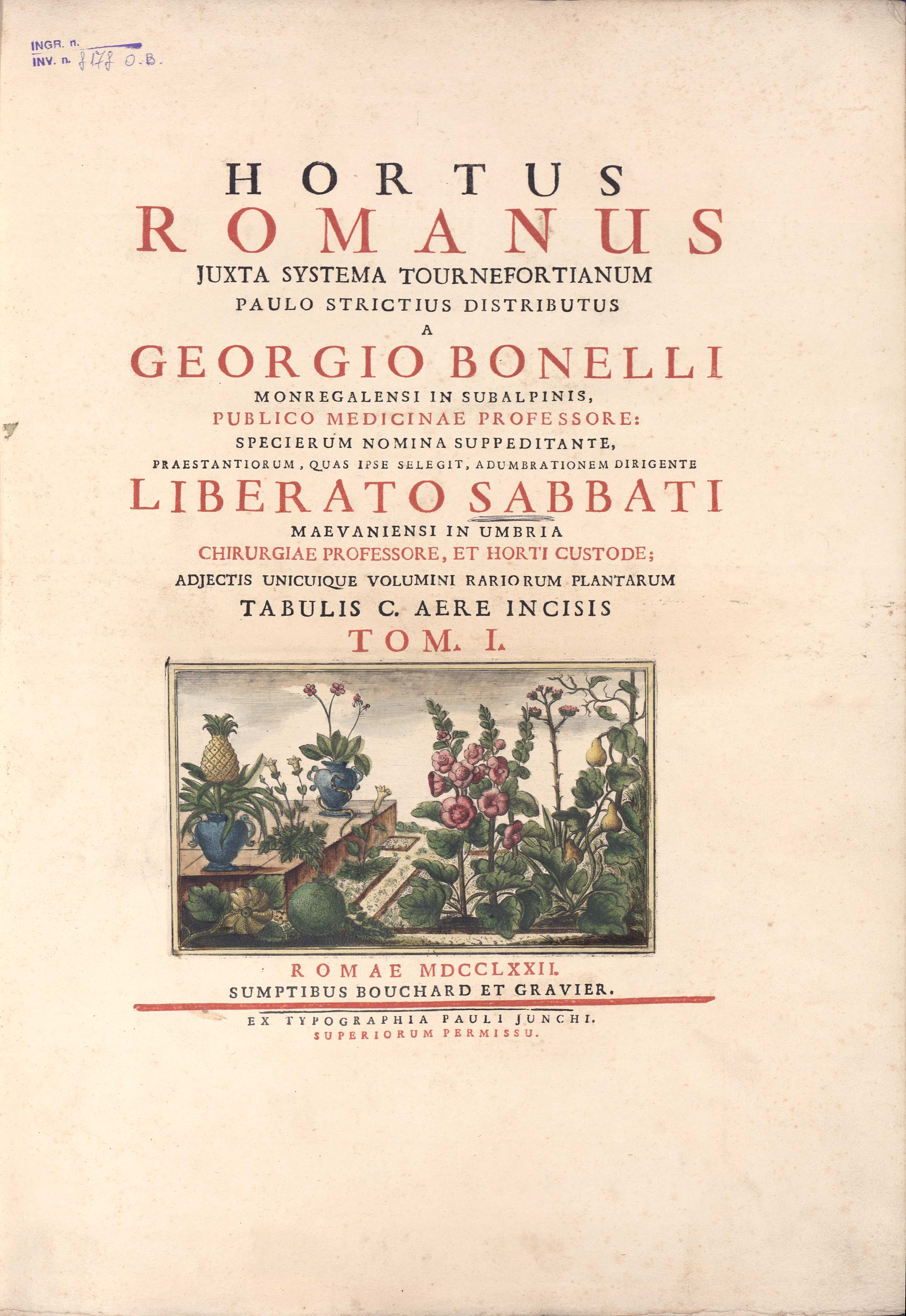
- Language: Latin
- Genre: Field manual

Hortus Romanus juxta systema Tournefortianum is a Latin-language field manual consisting of eight volumes of one hundred botanical illustrations each. The volumes were published in 1772, 1774, 1775, 1776, 1778, 1780, 1784, and 1793. The publication involved numerous contributors. Liberato Sabbati, Niccolò Martelli, and Costantino Sabbati were the authors; Giovanni Bouchard and Jean Joseph Gravier were publishers, and Cesare Ubertini was the artist.

== Contents ==
The book is made of half vellum with paper-covered boards, and its spine was labelled as Hortus Romanus Tom. I (-VIII). Each page consists of a plate illustration with a Latin caption, though most also have the name of the plant in English and French. All of the illustrations in the folio are hand-colored botanical prints.

Selected illustrations

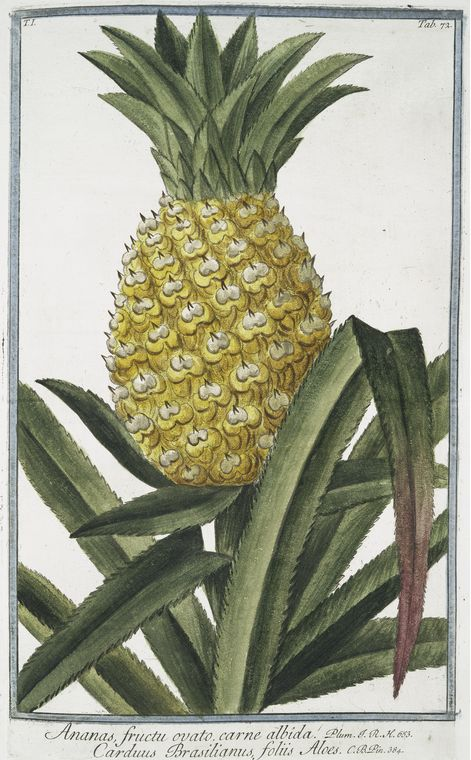
Pineapple

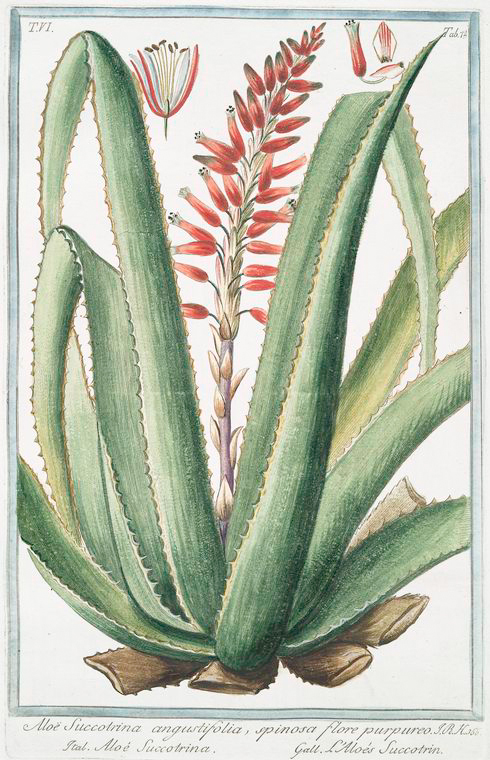
Aloe

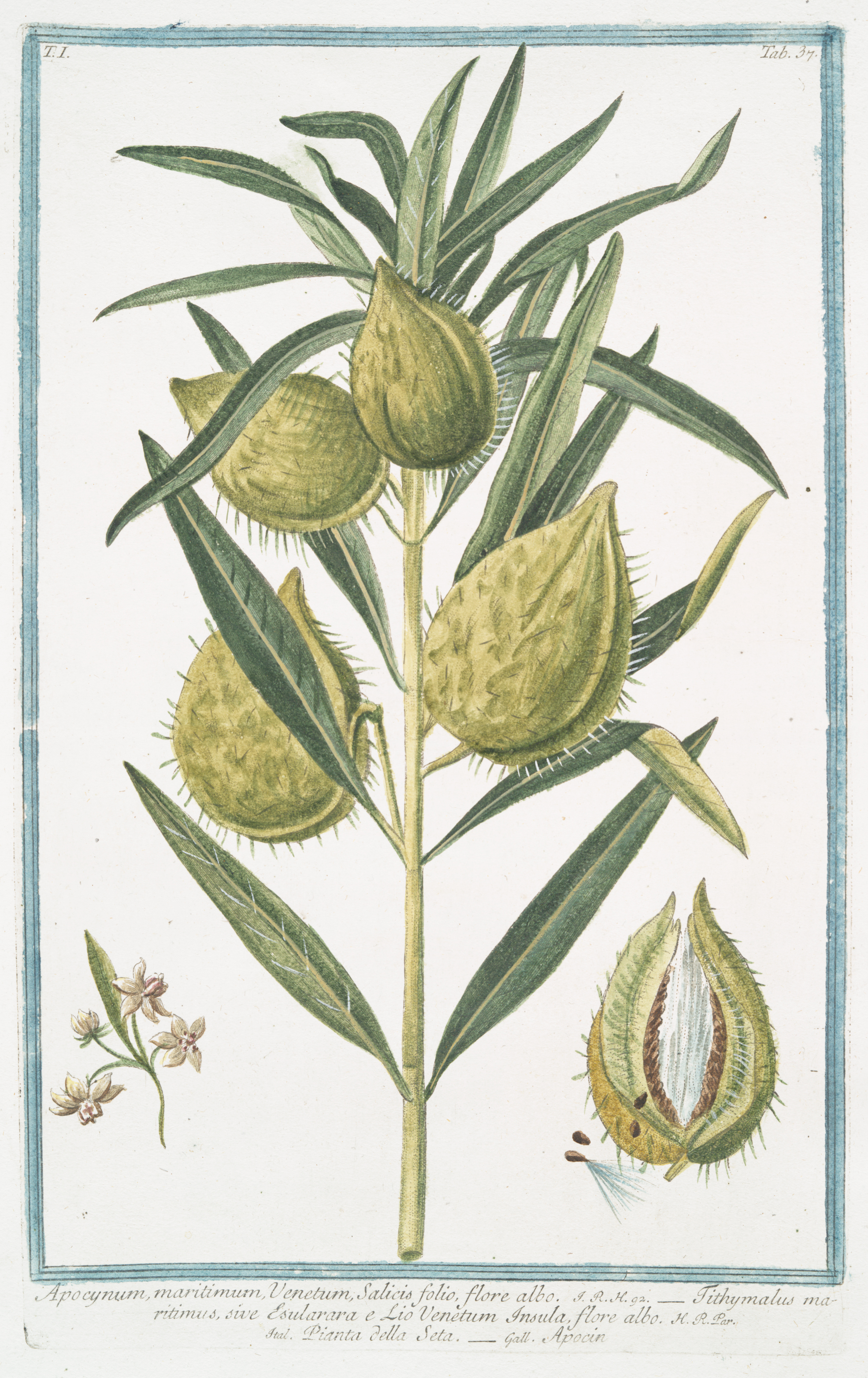
Gomphocarpus fruticosus

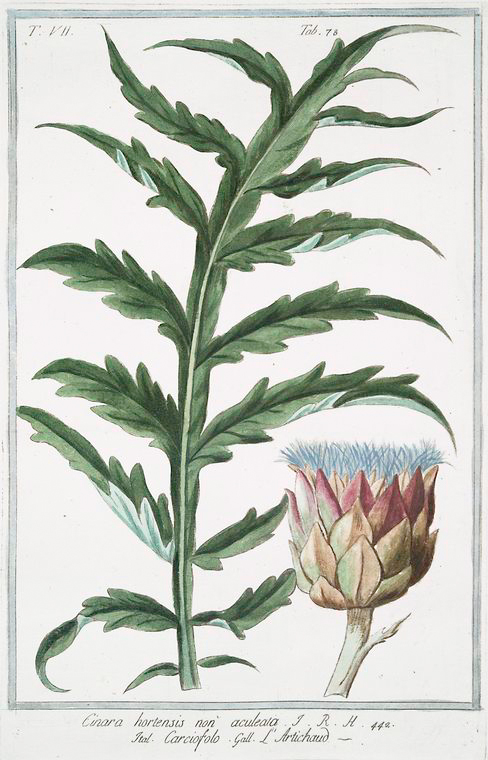
Artichoke

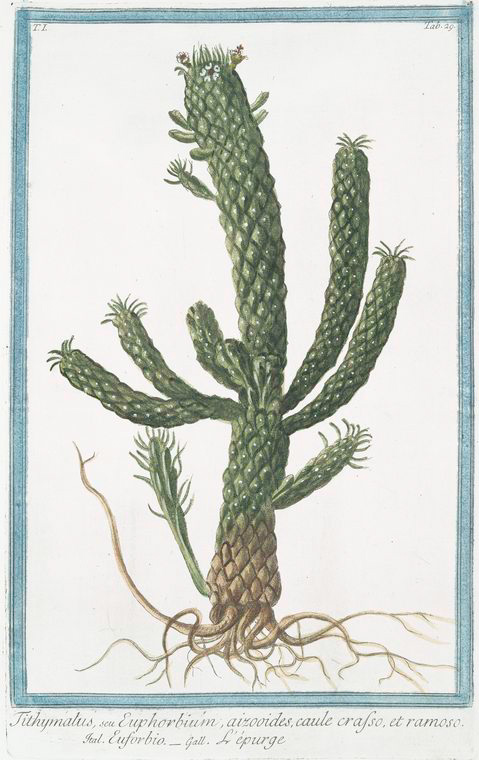
Euphorbia
