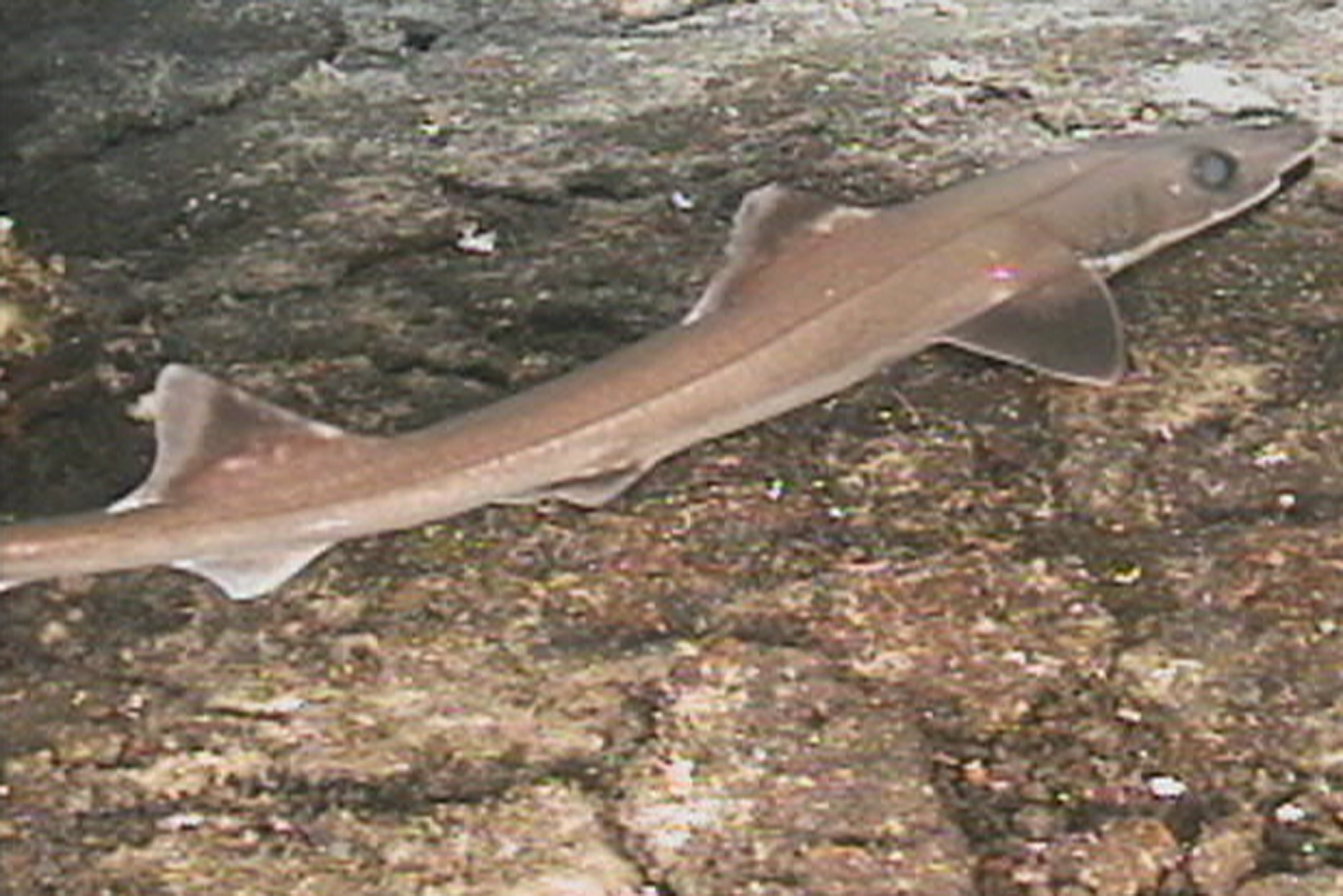

Conservation status
- Least Concern (IUCN 3.1)

Scientific classification
- Kingdom: Animalia
- Phylum: Chordata
- Class: Chondrichthyes
- Subclass: Elasmobranchii
- Division: Selachii
- Order: Carcharhiniformes
- Family: Pseudotriakidae
- Genus: Gollum
- Species: G. attenuatus

Binomial name
- Gollum attenuatus (Garrick, 1954)
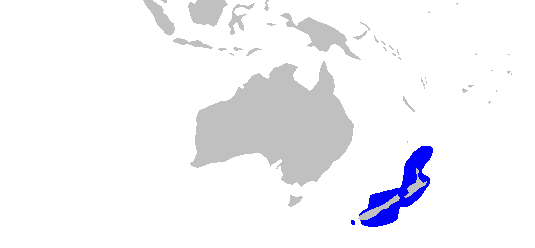
- Range of the slender smooth-hound

Synonyms
- Triakis attenuata Garrick, 1954

= Slender smooth-hound =

Species of shark

The slender smooth-hound or gollumshark (Gollum attenuatus) is a species of ground shark in the family Pseudotriakidae. It is endemic to the waters around New Zealand, where it is usually found close to the bottom over the continental slope at depths of 300–600 m (980–1,970 ft). An extremely slim, plain brownish shark reaching 1.1 m (3.6 ft) in length, the slender smooth-hound can be identified by its broad, flattened head with a long, distinctively bell-shaped snout. Its mouth is angular with short furrows at the corners, and contains a very high number of tooth rows in both jaws. Its two dorsal fins are roughly equal in size.

The diet of the slender smooth-hound is diverse, but dominated by small, benthic bony fishes and decapod crustaceans. It exhibits a specialised form of aplacental viviparity with oophagy: the females produce a single capsule in each uterus that contains 30–80 ova, of which one ovum develops into an embryo that consumes the rest of the ova and stores the yolk material in its external yolk sac. The growing embryo is mainly sustained by this yolk sac during gestation, though it may be additionally supplied with histotroph ("uterine milk") produced by the mother. The typical litter size is two pups, one per uterus. The International Union for Conservation of Nature (IUCN) has assessed the slender smooth-hound as Least Concern; it is taken as fishery bycatch but not in great numbers, and furthermore large portions of its range see minimal fishing activity.

== Taxonomy and phylogeny ==
The first known specimen of the slender smooth-hound was a 93 cm (37 in) long adult male collected by the trawler Maimai in December 1953, at a depth of 220 m (720 ft) off Cape Palliser on New Zealand's North Island. It was preserved by the crew as a curiosity and given to ichthyologist Jack Garrick, who described it in a 1954 issue of the scientific journal Transactions of the Royal Society of New Zealand. Garrick named the species Triakis attenuata, in reference to its extremely slender ("attenuate") body.

In 1973, Leonard Compagno proposed a separate genus for the slender smooth-hound: Gollum, after the character in J. R. R. Tolkien's The Lord of the Rings, "to whom this shark bears some resemblance in form and habits." He placed Gollum with the finback catsharks (Proscylliidae), but also noted its many anatomical similarities to the false catshark (Pseudotriakis microdon). At the time, Compagno chose to maintain Pseudotriakis as the sole member of the family Pseudotriakidae because of its numerous unique traits. More recently, he and other taxonomists have increasingly tended to group Gollum and Pseudotriakis together in the family Pseudotriakidae. This arrangement was corroborated by a 2006 phylogenetic study by Juan Andrés López and colleagues, which found that the two genera have a high degree of genetic similarity across four protein-coding genes and form a natural clade apart from Proscyllium. An additional species of Gollum has now been described, and there is at least one additional species yet to be described.

== Distribution and habitat ==
The range of the slender smooth-hound is restricted to the upper and middle continental slope around New Zealand, including submarine features to the north such as the Three Kings Ridge, the Challenger Plateau, and the Wanganella Bank. This uncommon species is mainly found between 300 and 600 m (980 and 1,970 ft) deep, but has been recorded from 129 to 724 m (423 to 2,375 ft) deep. It prefers a temperature of around 10 °C (50 °F) and a salinity of approximately 34.8‰. Generally swimming near the sea floor, this shark inhabits both soft and rocky-bottomed habitats in terrain ranging from plateaus to steep slopes.

== Description ==
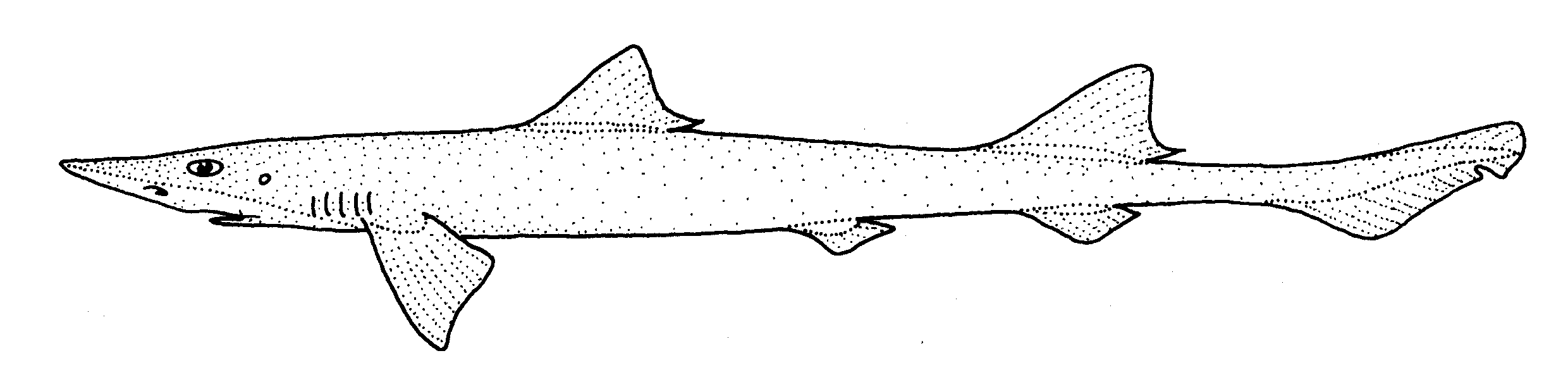
Distinctive traits of the slender smooth-hound include its thin body and long, flattened head.

The slender smooth-hound has a very thin body and a broad, highly flattened head. The snout is long, with a distinctive bell-shaped outline when viewed from above. The eyes have an elongate horizontal oval shape, and are equipped with rudimentary nictitating membranes (protective third eyelids). Beneath each eye is a prominent ridge, and behind is a much smaller spiracle. The nostrils are preceded by small, almost triangular flaps of skin. The line of the mouth forms an angle; there are very short furrows at the mouth corners. The upper and lower jaws contain 96–99 and 108–114 rows respectively of small, very closely spaced teeth; each tooth has a narrow upright central cusp flanked by smaller cusplets on both sides. The five pairs of gill slits are short.

The pectoral fins originate below the fourth gill slit and have gently curved margins. The pelvic fins are small and angular; the males have pointed claspers. The two dorsal fins are similar in size and shape, with narrowly rounded apexes and concave trailing margins. The first dorsal fin originates over rear of the pectoral fins, while the second dorsal fin originates between the pelvic and anal fins. A midline ridge is present between the dorsal fins. The anal fin is less than half as high as the first dorsal fin, and has a nearly straight trailing margin. The short and narrow caudal fin makes up about one-sixth of the total length; the lower caudal fin lobe is indistinct, while the upper lobe has a strong ventral notch near the tip. The skin is densely covered by small, overlapping dermal denticles. The crown of each denticle is mounted on a short stalk and bears three horizontal ridges leading to marginal blade-like teeth, with the central tooth particularly long. This species is plain brownish-gray above and lighter below. It grows up to 1.1 m (3.6 ft) long and 4 kg (8.8 lb) in weight, with females reaching a slightly larger size than males.

== Biology and ecology ==
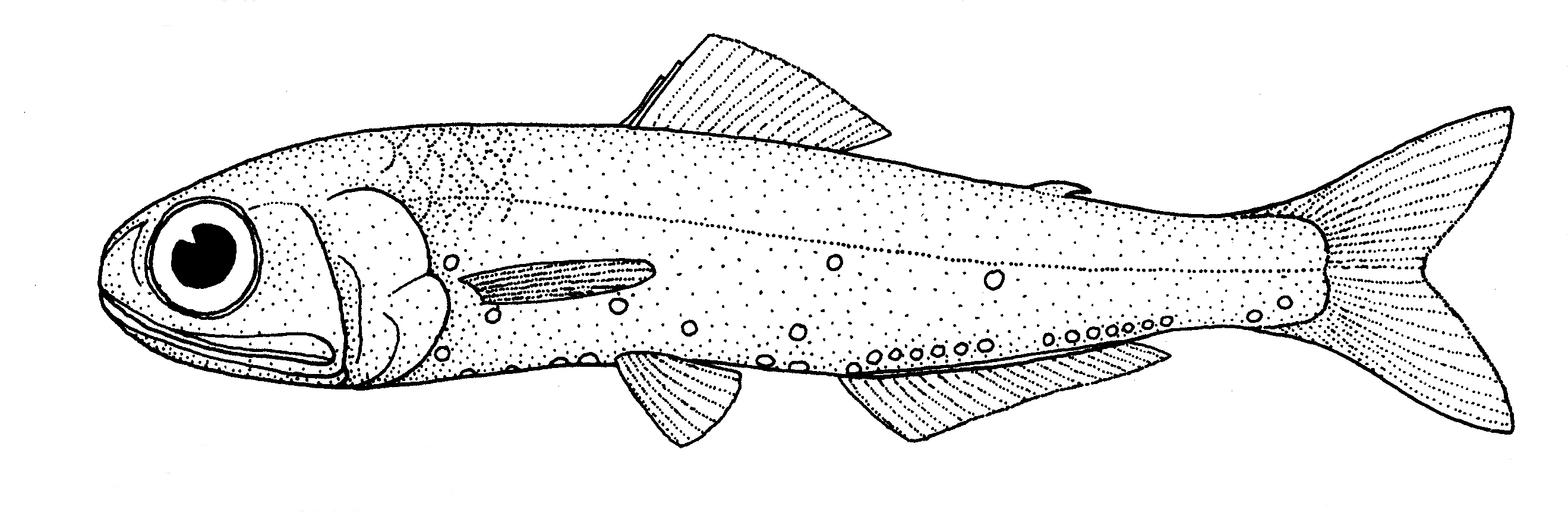
Lanternfishes are a major food source for the slender smooth-hound.

The slender smooth-hound is likely a schooling species. It preys on a variety of benthic fishes and invertebrates, and also scavenges; human garbage has been reported among its stomach contents. Small bony fishes, lanternfishes in particular, are the most important prey type, followed by decapod crustaceans. Cephalopods, gastropods, isopods, brittle stars, dogfish sharks, and cartilaginous fish egg capsules may also be consumed. On the Challenger Plateau, cephalopods are an important food source for juveniles under 50 cm (20 in) long.

Like the false catshark, the slender smooth-hound exhibits aplacental viviparity with oophagy, in a form different from that in the mackerel sharks. Mature females have a single functional ovary, on the right side, and two functional uteruses. Only one embryo develops within each uterus at a time, resulting in litters of two (rarely one) pups. The uterus inner surface is covered by villi. Within a uterus, 30–80 ova 4–8 mm (0.16–0.31 in) across are packed into a single rigid, amber-colored capsule; of these, only one ovum is fertilised and develops into an embryo, while the remaining ova begin to break down. The embryo consumes these other ova and transfers the yolk material into its external yolk sac, which serves as its main source of nourishment during gestation; this oophagous process is completed by an embryonic length of 10–39 mm (0.39–1.54 in). The embryo may also receive secondary nutrition in the form of histotroph ("uterine milk") produced by the mother. When the embryo is 29–40 mm (1.1–1.6 in) long, it emerges from the capsule, which by that time has become translucent and gelatinous. Embryos 4–25 cm (1.6–9.8 in) long have well-developed external gill filaments. The external yolk sac is entirely absorbed when the embryo is 34–42 cm (13–17 in) long and close to being born. Males and females reach sexual maturity at approximately 70 cm (28 in) long.

== Human interactions ==
Harmless to humans and of no economic value, the slender smooth-hound is occasionally caught incidentally in bottom trawls and on bottom longlines. Much of its northern range lies in little-fished waters, and thus the International Union for Conservation of Nature (IUCN) has listed it under Least Concern. However, this shark's very low fecundity would render it susceptible to population depletion should fishing pressure increase in the future. In June 2018 the New Zealand Department of Conservation classified the slender smooth-hound as "Not Threatened" with the qualifier "Secure Overseas" under the New Zealand Threat Classification System.
