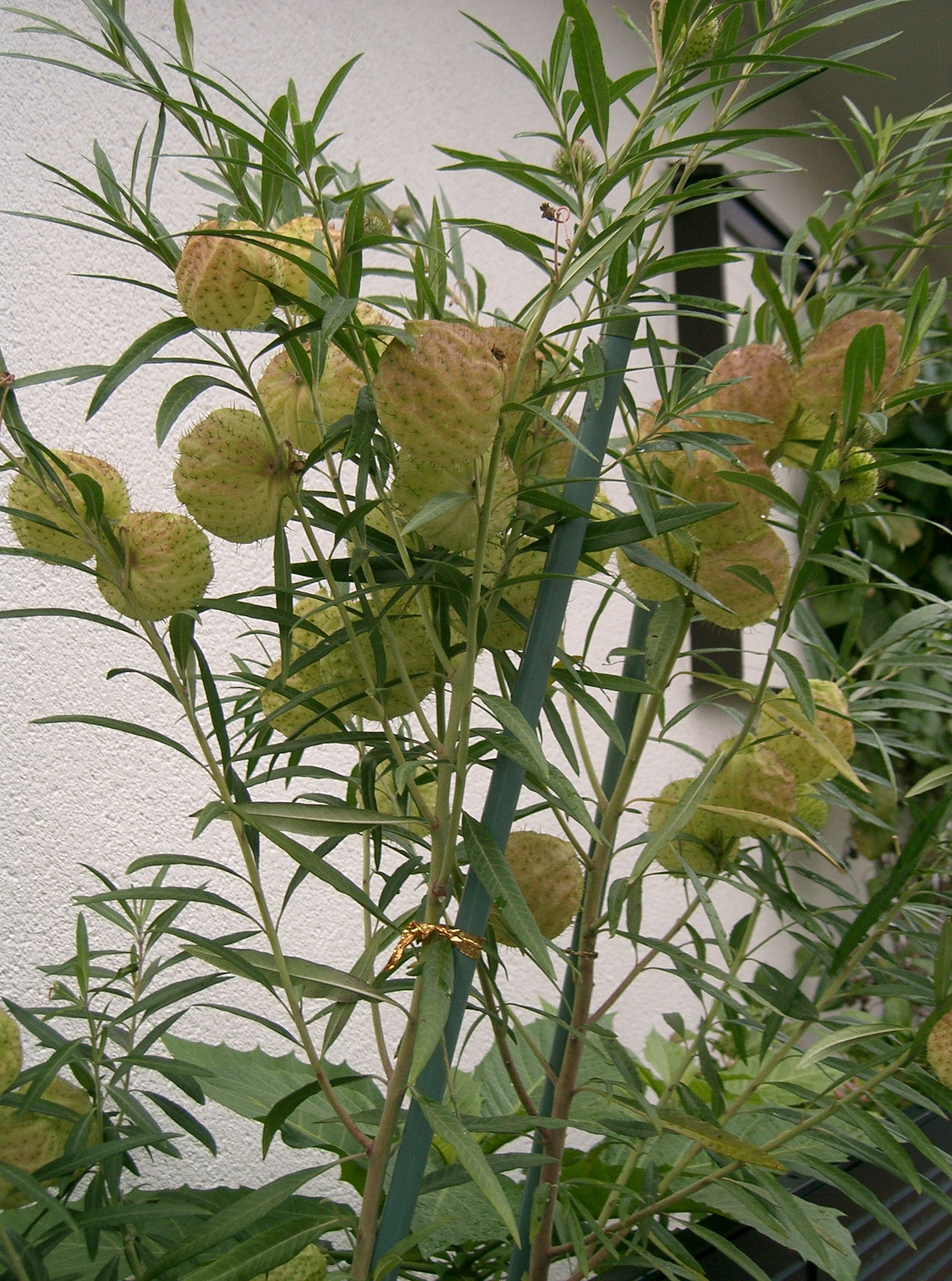
- Photo of balloonplant with capsules
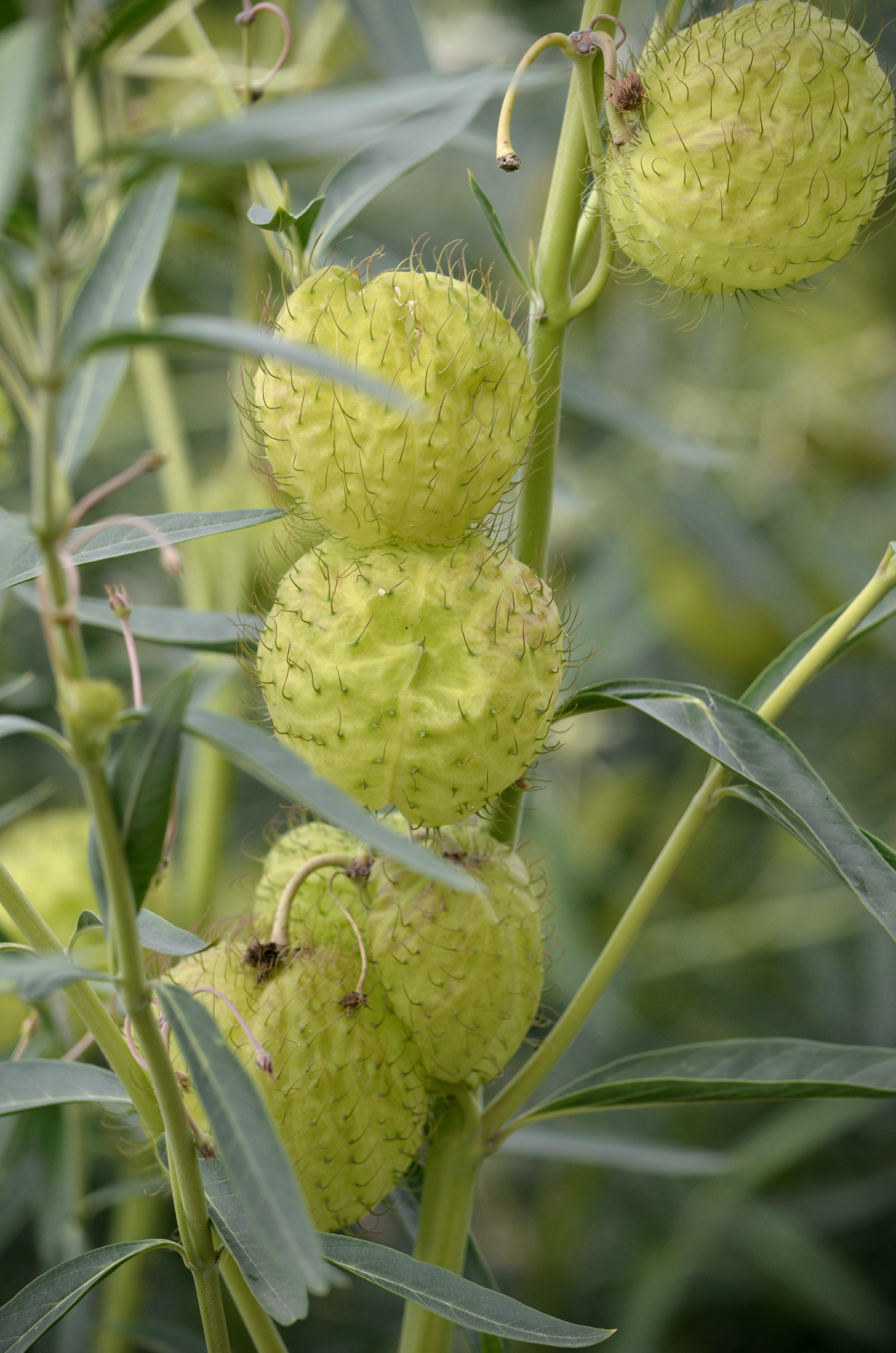
- Detail photo of balloonplant capsules

Scientific classification
- Kingdom: Plantae
- Clade: Embryophytes
- Clade: Tracheophytes
- Clade: Spermatophytes
- Clade: Angiosperms
- Clade: Eudicots
- Clade: Asterids
- Order: Gentianales
- Family: Apocynaceae
- Genus: Gomphocarpus
- Species: G. physocarpus

Binomial name
- Gomphocarpus physocarpus E.Mey.

Synonyms
- Homotypic Synonyms: Asclepias physocarpa (E.Mey.) Schltr.; Heterotypic Synonyms: Asclepias brasiliensis (E.Fourn.) Schltr.; Gomphocarpus brasiliensis E.Fourn.; Gomphocarpus fruticosus f. brasiliensis (E.Fourn.) Briq.

= Gomphocarpus physocarpus =

Species of flowering plant

Gomphocarpus physocarpus is a species of flowering plant in the Milkweed subfamily, Asclepiadoideae, and Dogbane Family Apocynaceae. It is commonly known as hairy balls, balloonplant, balloon cotton-bush, bishop's balls, nailhead, or swan plant. The plant is native to southeast Africa, but it has been widely naturalised as it is often used as an ornamental plant.

== Description ==
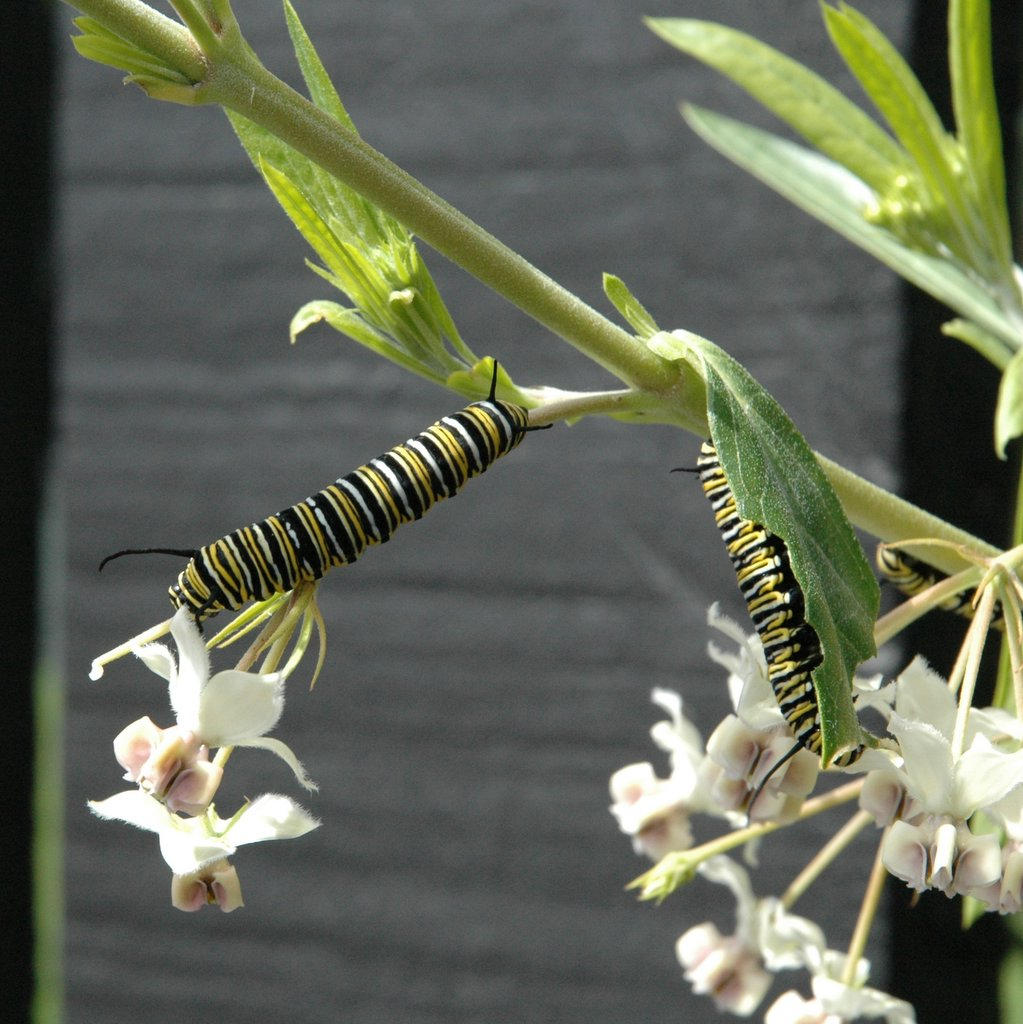
Monarch butterfly caterpillars feeding on Gomphocarpus physocarpus

Gomphocarpus physocarpus is an undershrub perennial herb, that can grow to 2 m (6 ft 7 in) tall with narrow lanceolate leaves. The plant blooms in warm months. It grows on roadside banks, at altitudes of 850–1,500 m (2,790–4,920 ft) above sea level. The plant prefers moderate moisture, as well as sandy and well-drained soil and full sun.

Its propagation can be done by seeds or by cuttings. The seeds can be sown in a light, well-drained substrate. Cuttings about 10 cm long with the basal leaves removed can be planted in a pot with light, well-draining substrate.

Gomphocarpus physocarpus is traditionally used to produce ointments for the treatment of warts and the seeds are used in rituals. The leaves and stems produce milky latex that contains carbohydrates, cardiac glycosides (cardenolides), terpenoids, alkaloids, and phenols.

The flowers are small, with white hoods and about 1 cm across. The follicle (a type of fruit) is a pale green, in shape an inflated spheroid, and filled with air. It is covered with rough hairs. It reaches 8 cm (3.1 in) diameter. The leaves are light green, linear to lanceolate and 7–10 cm (2.8–3.9 in) long, 1.2 cm (0.47 in) broad. The brown seeds have silky tufts.

This plant will readily hybridize with Gomphocarpus fruticosus creating intermediate forms.

Other names for the plant include in Afrikaans: balmelkbossie, balbossie, wilde kapok and in Zulu: umbababa, umbemiso, umangwazane, umqumnqwewe, uphuphuma, usingalwesalukazi, umsingalwesalukazi.

== Ecology ==
The plant's stamens are fused to the head of the style and all the pollen of each stamen is within two pollinia. The pouch-like structure formed by the petals that surrounds the reproductive organs encourages pollinia to stick to the legs or proboscis of pollinating insects. As a result, the pollen packets are carried from plant to plant. The species is self-incompatible, and these specialised structures support this reproduction.

Gomphocarpus physocarpus is a food of the caterpillars of Danaus butterflies, including the African monarch butterfly (Danaus chrysippus orientis). They store the unpleasant tasting and toxic cardenolides from the plants to deter predators. Distinctive colouration alerts predators before they attack.

== Toxicity ==
The sap produced by the plants is toxic, and if ingested all parts can potentially affect the heart, breathing, central nervous system and the stomach. It may also cause eye injuries. In 2017 a Northland, New Zealand man was reported to have become temporarily blind after getting sap in his eyes, with one eye still affected nine months later.
