= Gomphocarpus purpurascens =

Scientific classification
- Kingdom: Plantae
- Clade: Tracheophytes
- Clade: Angiosperms
- Clade: Eudicots
- Clade: Asterids
- Order: Gentianales
- Family: Apocynaceae
- Genus: Gomphocarpus
- Species: G. purpurascens

Binomial name
- Gomphocarpus purpurascens A.Rich.

Synonyms
- Asclepias albida N.E.Br.; Asclepias pubiseta N.E.Br.

Species of plant

Gomphocarpus purpurascens, is a species of plant endemic to Ethiopia, where it is used medicinally to treat fever.
