= Xysmalobium samoritourei =

Scientific classification
- Kingdom: Plantae
- Clade: Tracheophytes
- Clade: Angiosperms
- Clade: Eudicots
- Clade: Asterids
- Order: Gentianales
- Family: Apocynaceae
- Genus: Xysmalobium
- Species: X. samoritourei

Binomial name
- Xysmalobium samoritourei Goyder

Species of plant

Xysmalobium samoritourei is a species of plant native to the highlands of Guinea. It is an erect perennial herb with annual stems. It is delimited as a member of the Apocynaceae family and classified as an endangered species.

== Description ==
The plant is an erect herb that grows up to 35 cm high, with a tuberous stem that is napiform and grows underground. The terminal inflorescence is greenish-yellow, long-pedicellate, and umbelliform, featuring 25–50 flowers.

== Distribution ==
This species is largely found in the countries of Guinea and Sierra Leone.
