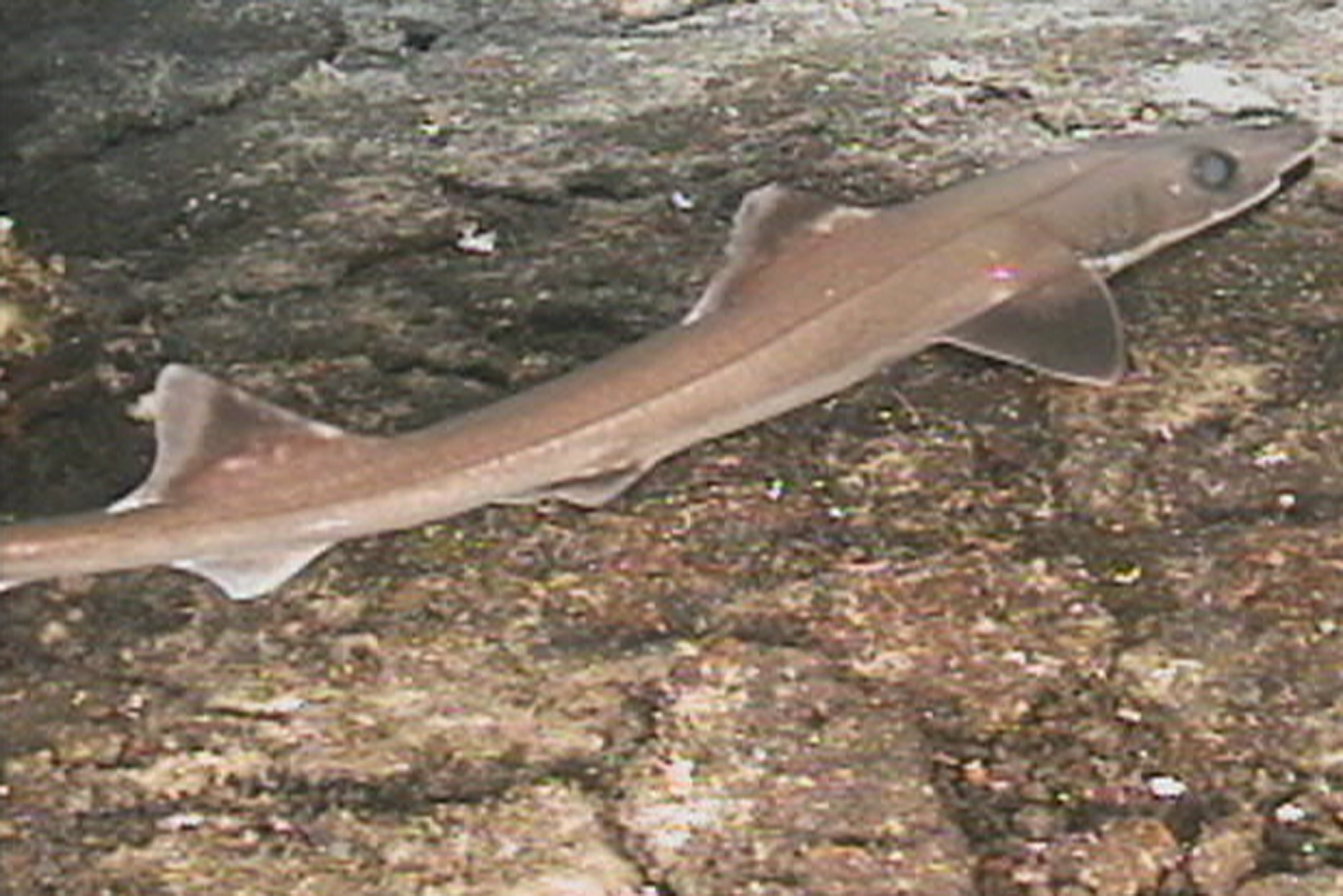
- Slender smooth-hound (G. attenuatus)

Scientific classification
- Kingdom: Animalia
- Phylum: Chordata
- Class: Chondrichthyes
- Subclass: Elasmobranchii
- Division: Selachii
- Order: Carcharhiniformes
- Family: Pseudotriakidae
- Genus: Gollum; Compagno, 1973

Type species
- Triakis attenuata Garrick, 1954

= Gollum (shark) =

Genus of sharks

Gollum is a genus of ground sharks in the family Pseudotriakidae, native to the southwestern Pacific Ocean. The genus was described in 1973 by biologist Leonard Compagno, who named it named after the character Gollum from J. R. R. Tolkien's works, noting the species Gollum attenuatus (the slender smooth-hound) "bears some resemblance in form and habits".

== Species ==
The currently described species and one undescribed species in this genus are:

- Gollum attenuatus (Garrick, 1954) (slender smooth-hound)
- Gollum suluensis Last & Gaudiano, 2011 (Sulu gollumshark)
- Gollum sp. B not yet described (white-marked gollumshark)

== See also ==
- Aenigmachanna gollum, a species of fish named after the same character from Tolkien's works.
