= Oophagy =

Practice of embryos feeding on eggs

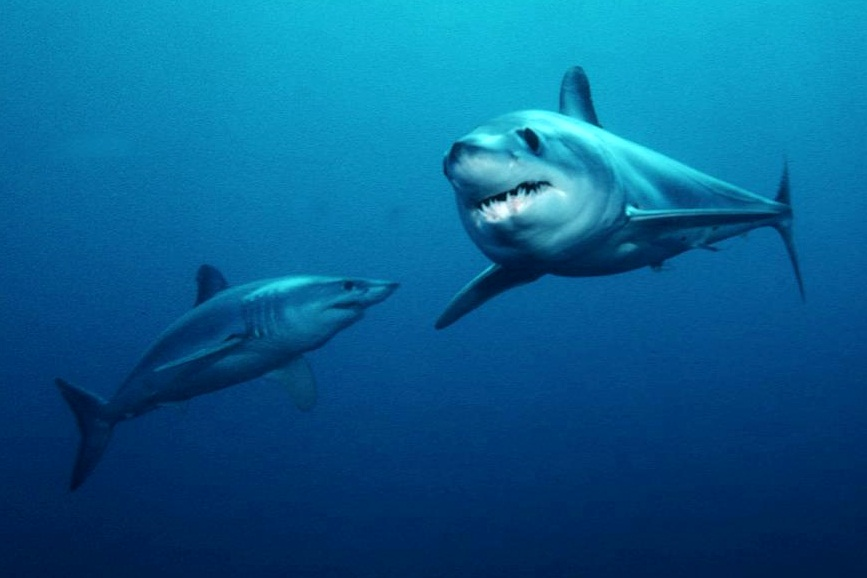
Embryonic oophagy occurs in shortfin mako.

Oophagy (/oʊˈɒfədʒi/ oh-OFF-ə-jee) or ovophagy, literally "egg eating", is the practice of embryos feeding on eggs produced by the ovary while still inside the mother's uterus. The word oophagy is formed from the classical Greek ᾠόν (ōion, "egg") and classical Greek φᾱγεῖν (phāgein, "to eat"). In contrast, adelphophagy is the cannibalism of a multi-celled embryo.

Oophagy is thought to occur in all sharks in the order Lamniformes and has been recorded in the bigeye thresher (Alopias superciliosus), the pelagic thresher (A. pelagicus), the shortfin mako (Isurus oxyrinchus) and the porbeagle (Lamna nasus) among others. It also occurs in the tawny nurse shark (Nebrius ferrugineus), and in the family Pseudotriakidae.

This practice may lead to larger embryos or prepare the embryo for a predatory lifestyle.

There are variations in the extent of oophagy among the different shark species. The grey nurse shark (Carcharias taurus) practices intrauterine cannibalism, the first developed embryo consuming both additional eggs and any other developing embryos. Slender smooth-hounds (Gollum attenuatus), form egg capsules which contain 30-80 ova, within which only one ovum develops; the remaining ova are ingested and their yolks stored in its external yolk sac. The embryo then proceeds to develop normally, without ingesting further eggs.

Oophagy is used as a synonym of the egg predation practised by some snakes and other animals.

Oophagy is used to describe the destruction of non-queen eggs in nests of eusocial insects, especially the social wasps, bees, and ants. This is seen in the wasp species Polistes biglumis and Polistes humilis. Oophagy has been observed in the ant Leptothorax acervorum and the wasp Parachartergus fraternus, where oophagy is practiced to increase energy circulation and provide more dietary protein. The social wasp Polistes fuscatus use oophagy as a method to establish a dominance hierarchy; dominant females eat the eggs of subordinate females such that they no longer produce eggs, possibly due to the unnecessary expenditure of energy and resources. This behavior has also been observed in some bee species. Such bee species include Xylocopa sulcatipes and Bombus ruderatus, where queen bees will eat larvae deposited by workers or eject them from the nest in order to maintain dominance over the colony.

== See also ==
- Siblicide
