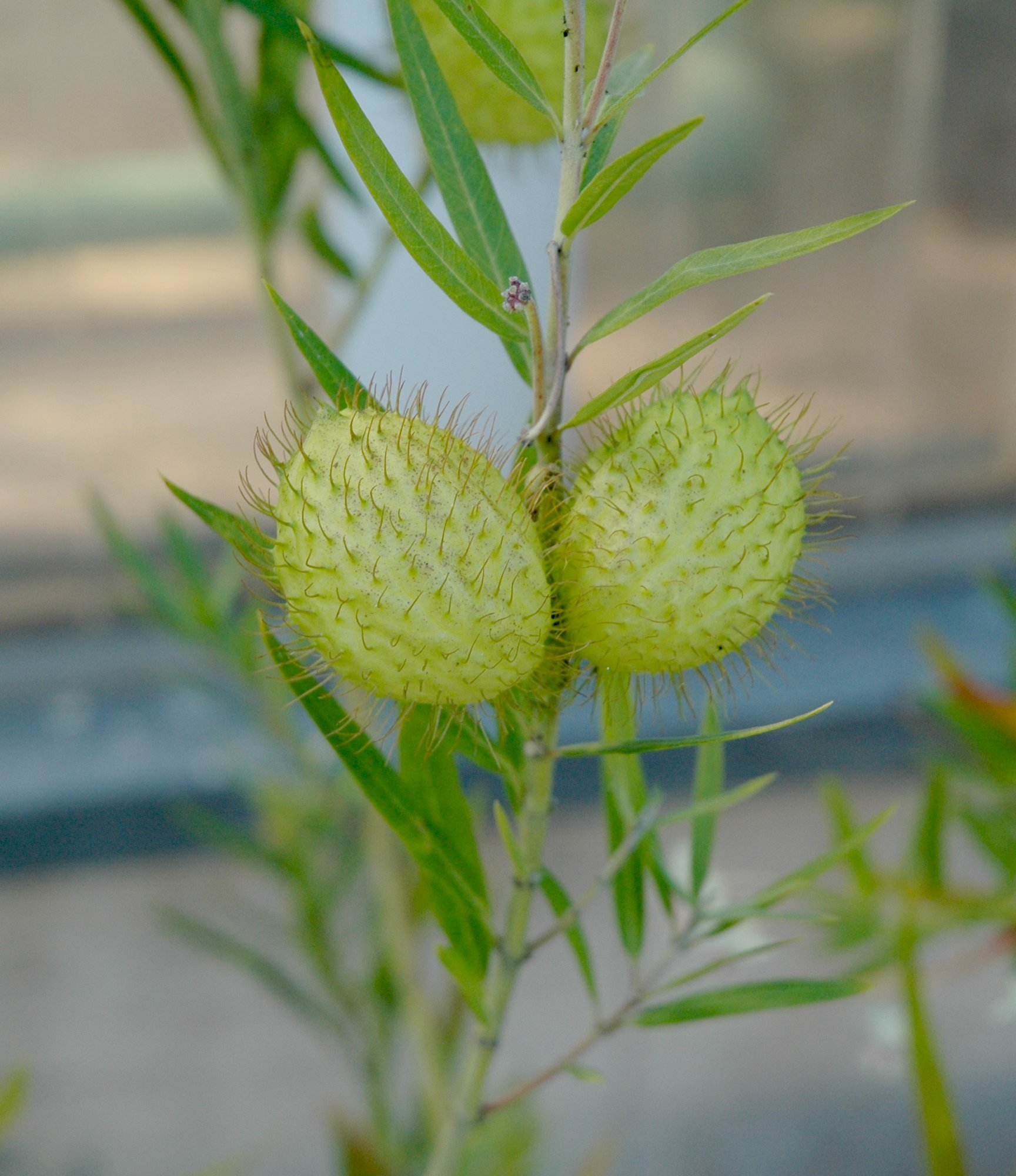

Scientific classification
- Kingdom: Plantae
- Clade: Embryophytes
- Clade: Tracheophytes
- Clade: Spermatophytes
- Clade: Angiosperms
- Clade: Eudicots
- Clade: Asterids
- Order: Gentianales
- Family: Apocynaceae
- Genus: Gomphocarpus
- Species: G. fruticosus

Binomial name
- Gomphocarpus fruticosus (L.) W.T.Aiton

Synonyms
- List: Apocynum salicifolium Medik.; Asclepias angustifolia Schweigg.; Asclepias cornuta (Decne.) Cordem.; Asclepias crinita (G.Bertol.) N.E.Br.; Asclepias decipiens N.E.Br.; Asclepias flavida N.E.Br.; Asclepias fruticosa L.; Asclepias glabra Mill.; Asclepias rostrata N.E.Br.; Asclepias salicifolia Salisb. nom. illeg.; Asclepias setosa Forssk.; Asclepias virgata Balb.; Gomphocarpus angustifolius (Schweigg.) Link; Gomphocarpus arachnoideus E.Fourn.; Gomphocarpus cornutus Decne.; Gomphocarpus crinitus G.Bertol.; Gomphocarpus rostratus (N.E.Br.) Bullock; Gomphocarpus setosus (Forssk.) R.Br. ex Schult.

= Gomphocarpus fruticosus =

Species of flowering plant

Gomphocarpus fruticosus (swan plant; narrow-leaved cotton bush) is a species of plant native to South Africa. It is also common in Australia and New Zealand where it is a host of the monarch butterfly. The plant's tissues contain sufficient cardenolides that consumption of significant quantities of the plant's leaves, stems, or fruit may lead to death in livestock and humans.

The plant, also referred to as Narrow leaf cotton bush, has officially been declared a pest in Western Australia.

The species is closely related to Gomphocarpus physocarpus.

== Gallery ==
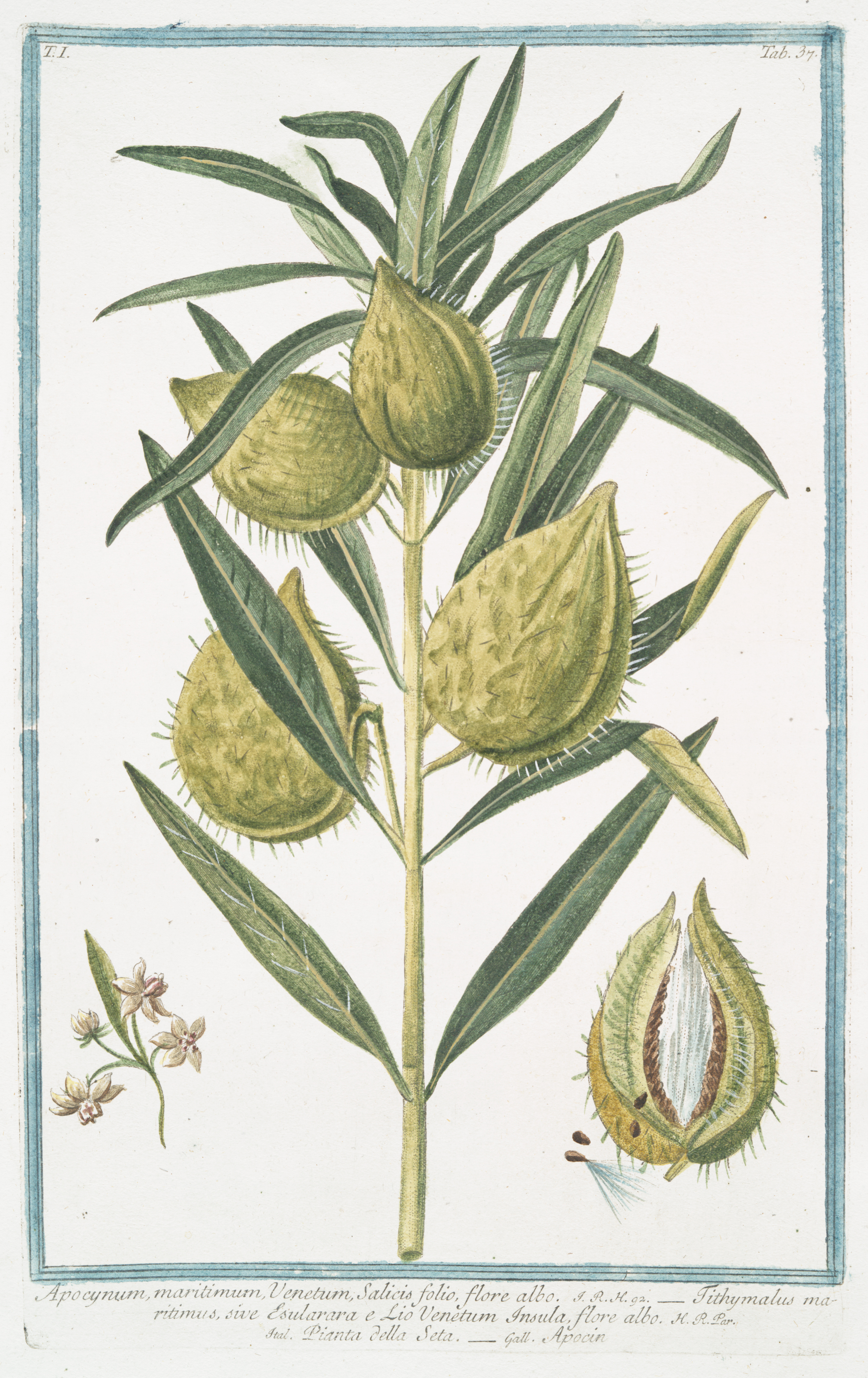
An illustration of the species in Hortus Romanus

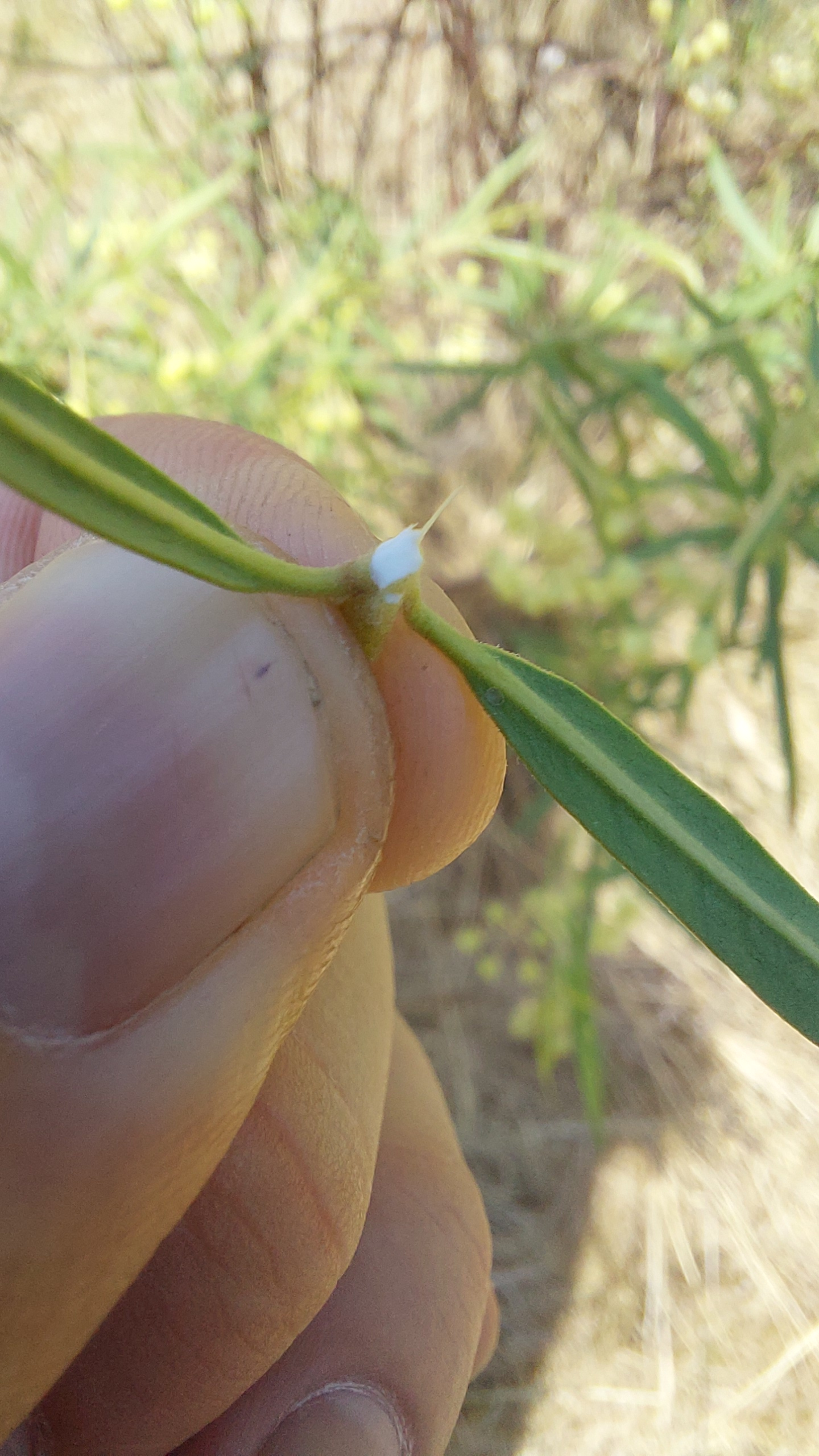
Gomphocarpus fruticosus latex sap

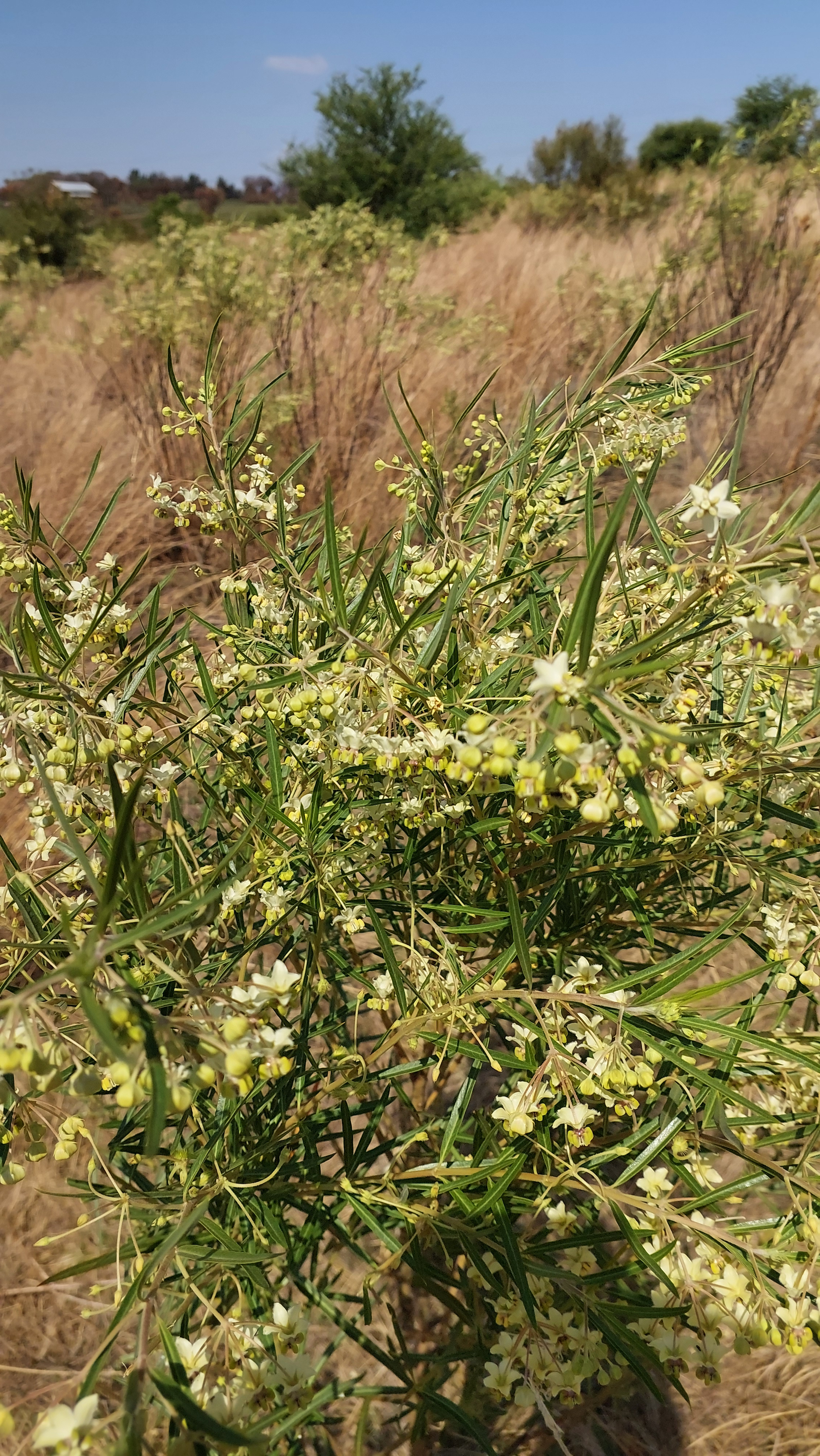
Gomphocarpus fruticosus bush

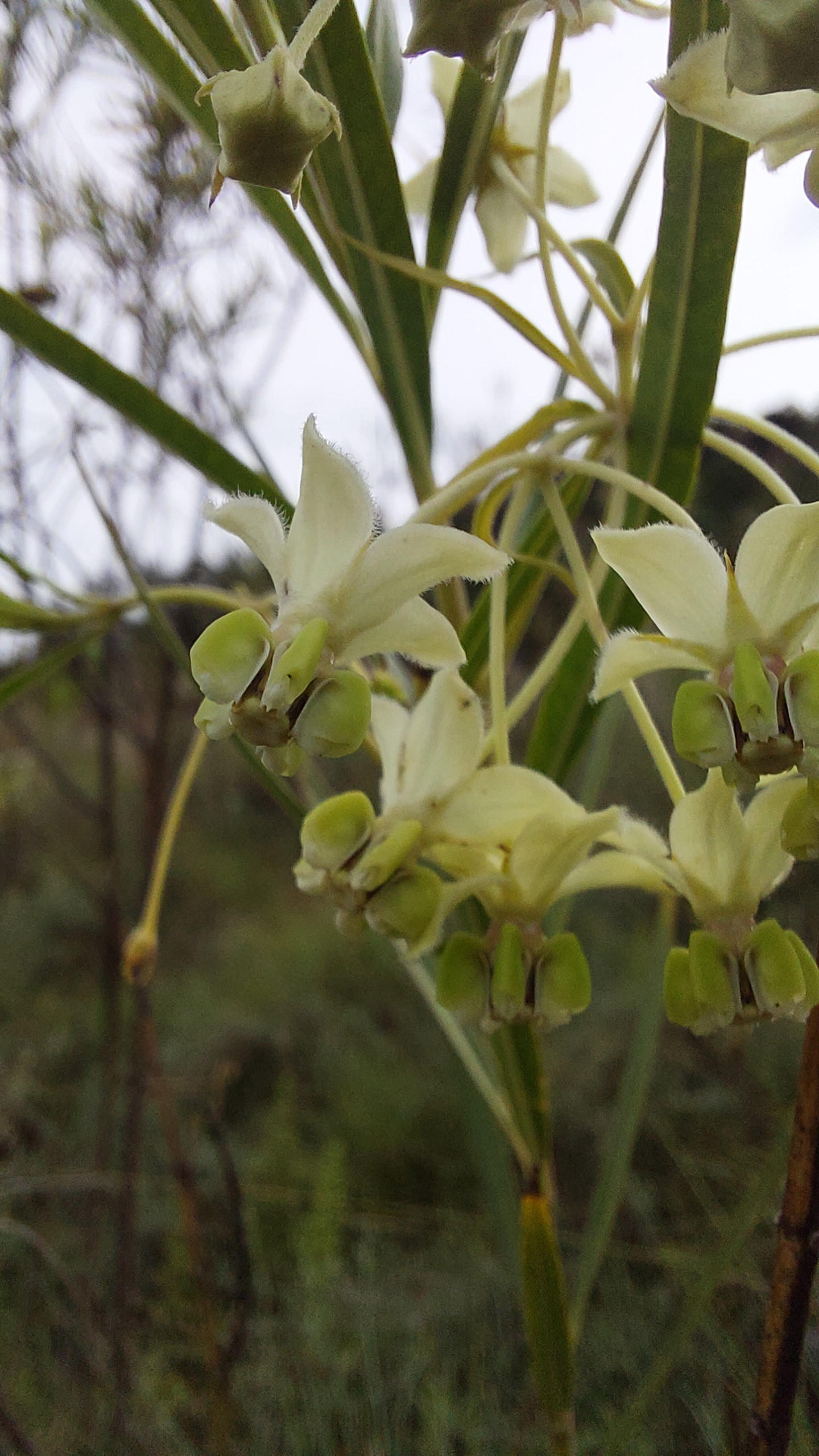
Gomphocarpus fruticosus open flower

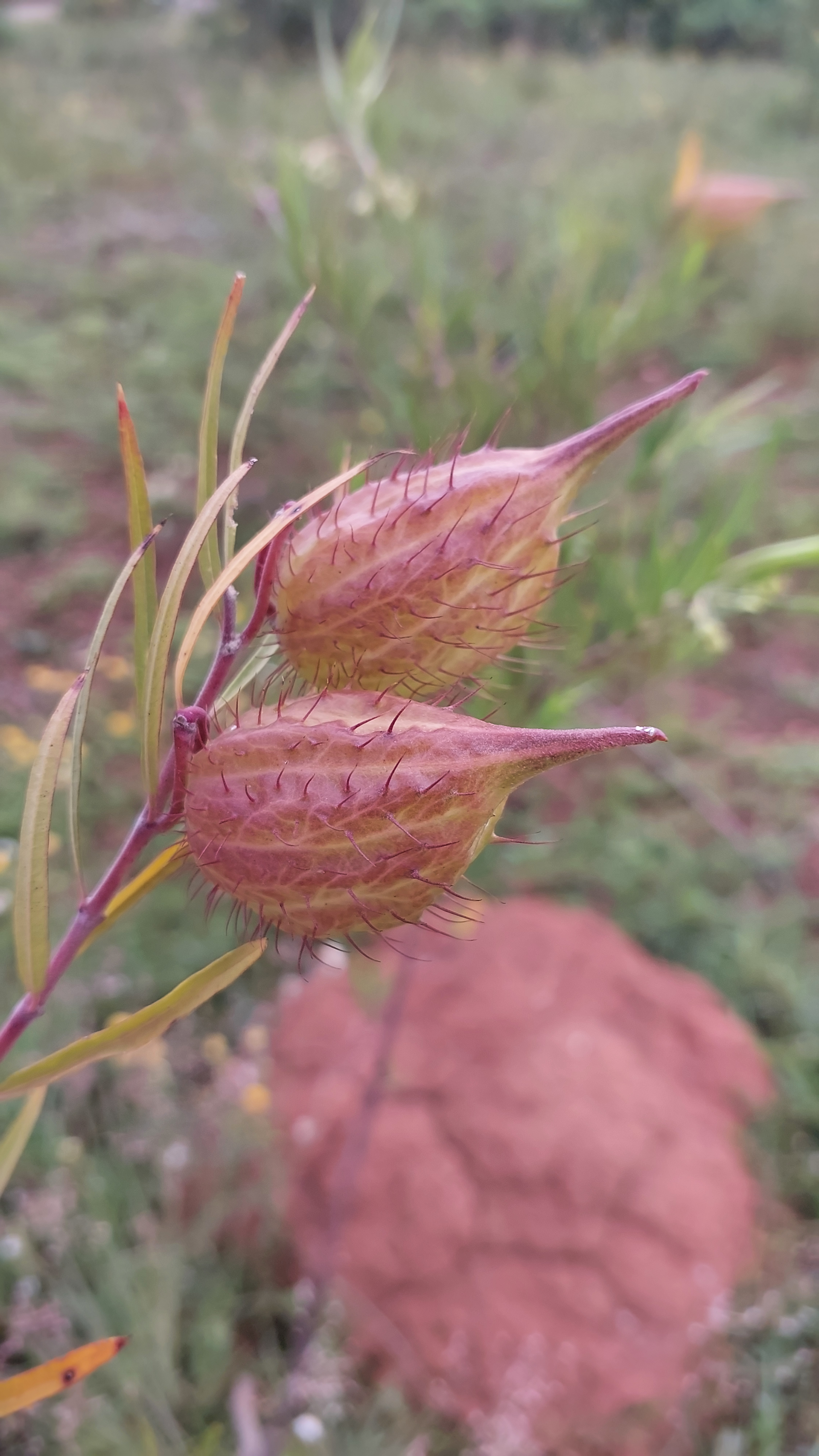
Gomphocarpus fruticosus fruit

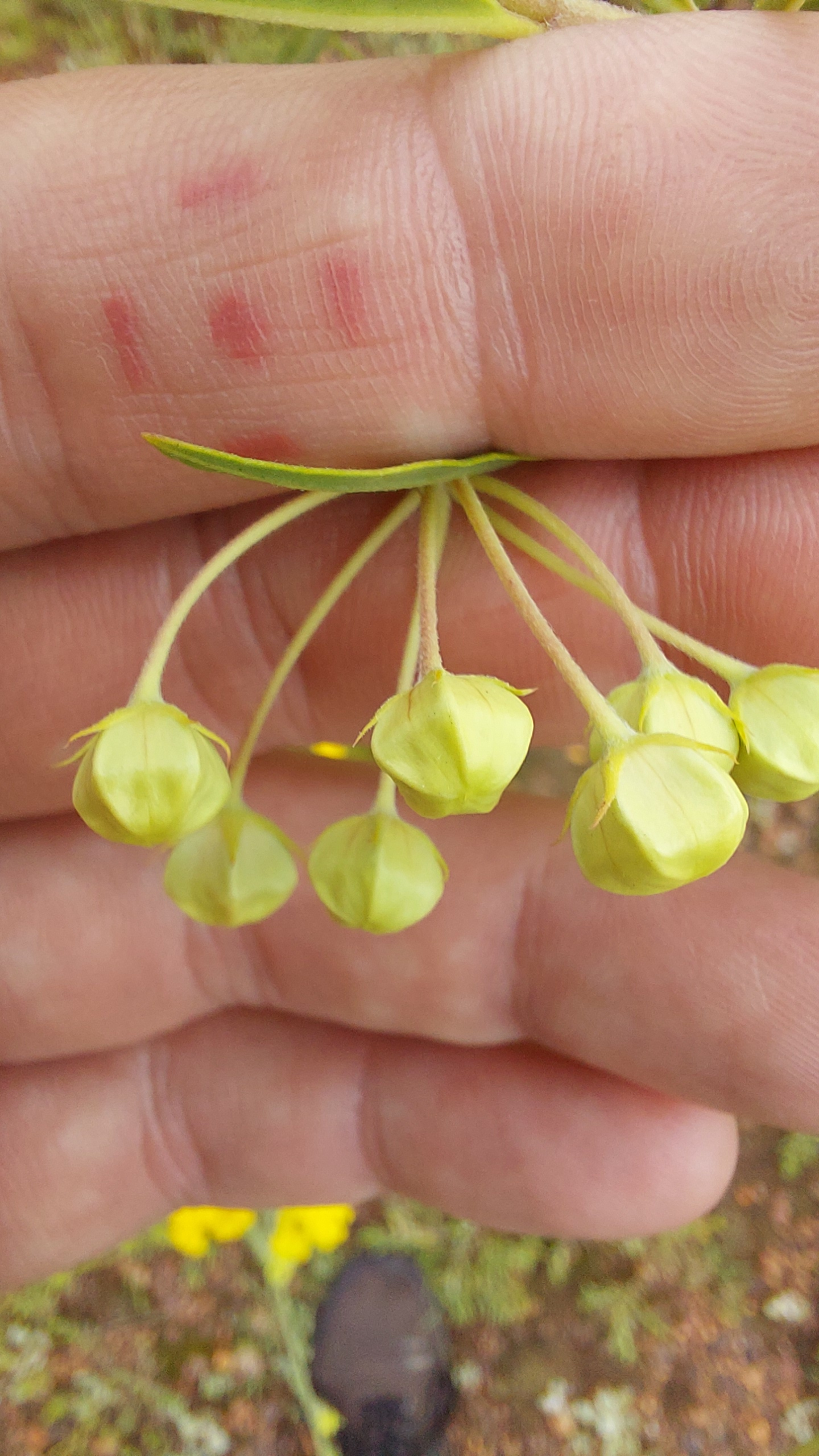
Gomphocarpus fruticosus flower bud
