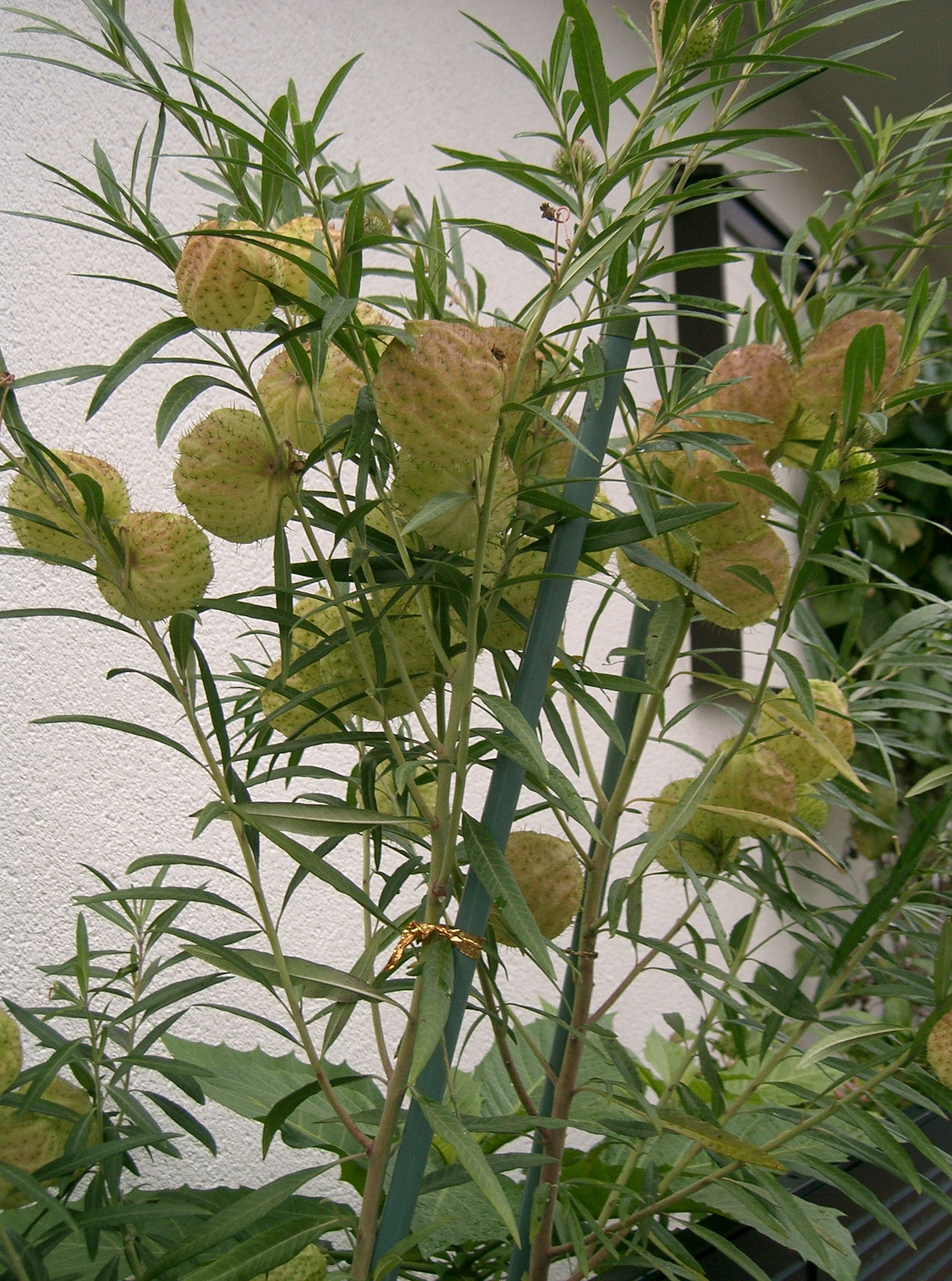
- Gomphocarpus physocarpus

Scientific classification
- Kingdom: Plantae
- Clade: Tracheophytes
- Clade: Angiosperms
- Clade: Eudicots
- Clade: Asterids
- Order: Gentianales
- Family: Apocynaceae
- Subfamily: Asclepiadoideae
- Tribe: Asclepiadeae
- Genus: Gomphocarpus; R.Br.

= Gomphocarpus =

Genus of plants

Gomphocarpus is a genus of plants in the family Apocynaceae first described as a genus in 1810. It is in the milkweed subfamily Asclepiadoideae, and its members are considered milkweeds. It is widespread across much of Africa, with a few species naturalized in other regions.

Species accepted

1. Gomphocarpus abyssinicus - Ethiopia
2. Gomphocarpus cancellatus - South Africa
3. Gomphocarpus filiformis - SW Africa
4. Gomphocarpus fruticosus - South Africa
5. Gomphocarpus glaucophyllus - South Africa
6. Gomphocarpus integer - SE Africa
7. Gomphocarpus kaessneri - Kenya
8. Gomphocarpus munonquensis - Angola
9. Gomphocarpus peltiger - South Africa
10. Gomphocarpus phillipsiae - SE Africa
11. Gomphocarpus physocarpus - South Africa; naturalized in China, N + S America
12. Gomphocarpus praticola - Angola
13. Gomphocarpus purpurascens - Ethiopia
14. Gomphocarpus rivularis - South Africa
15. Gomphocarpus semiamplectens - tropical Africa
16. Gomphocarpus semilunatus - Ethiopia
17. Gomphocarpus sinaicus - Sinai Peninsula
18. Gomphocarpus stenophyllus - tropical Africa
19. Gomphocarpus swynnertonii - Mozambique, Zimbabwe
20. Gomphocarpus tenuifolius - Zimbabwe
21. Gomphocarpus tomentosus - South Africa
