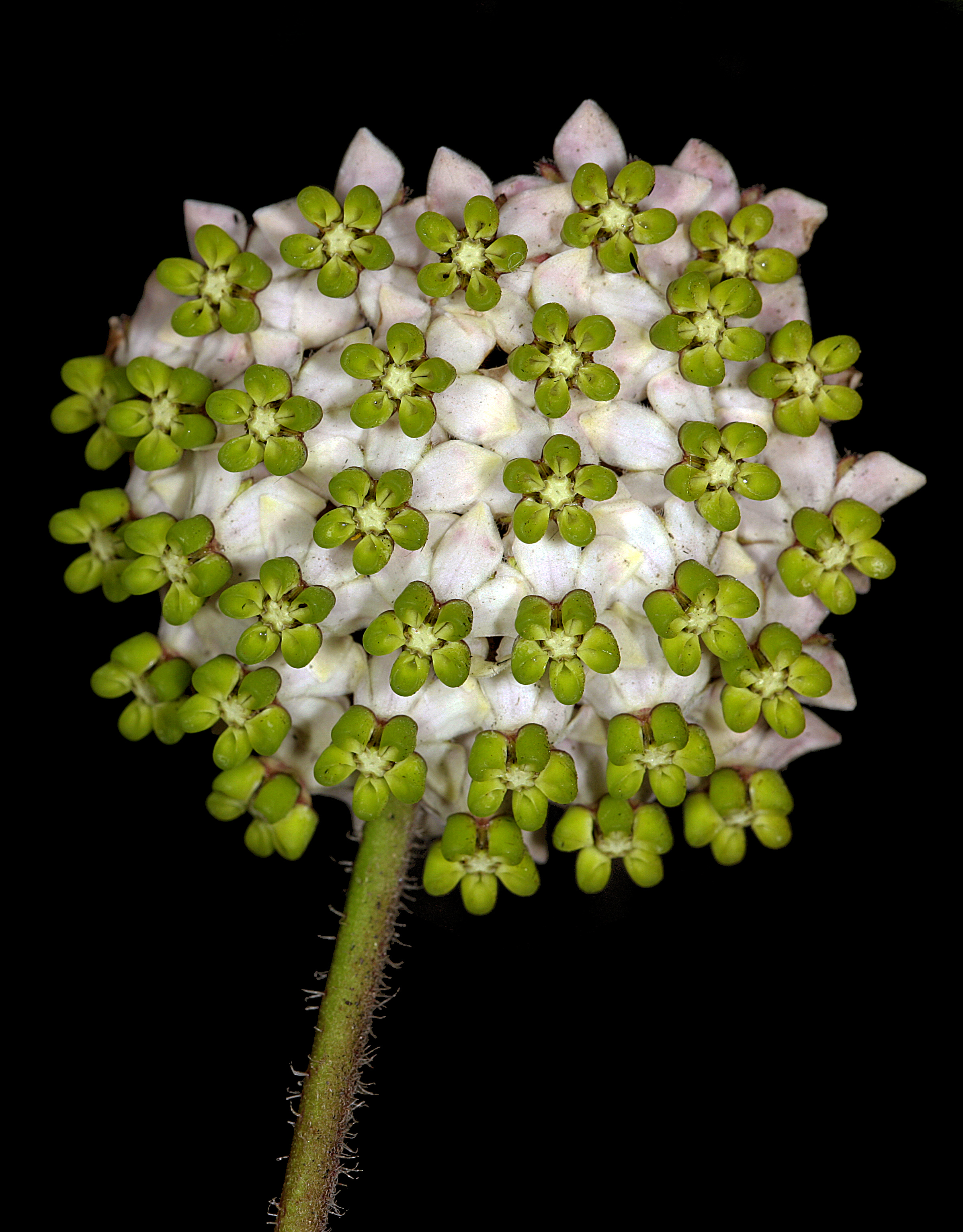

Scientific classification
- Kingdom: Plantae
- Clade: Embryophytes
- Clade: Tracheophytes
- Clade: Spermatophytes
- Clade: Angiosperms
- Clade: Eudicots
- Clade: Asterids
- Order: Gentianales
- Family: Apocynaceae
- Genus: Asclepias
- Species: A. albens

Binomial name
- Asclepias albens (E.Mey.) Schltr.

Synonyms
- Gomphocarpus albens (E.Mey.) Decne.; Pachycarpus albens E.Mey.; Xysmalobium albens (E.Mey.) D.Dietr.; Asclepias affinis (Schltr.) Schltr.; Gomphocarpus affinis Schltr.

= Asclepias albens =

Species of flowering plant

Asclepias albens is a species of widespread, perennial flowering plant in the family Apocynaceae. This milkweed is endemic to South Africa. It is the most common milkweed there. It grows in grassland at an altitude of 10-1700 m in the grassy biome. It grows in grasslands prone to frequent burning and full sunlight, often in rocky areas. Its common name is cartwheels. It is in the family Apocynaceae.
