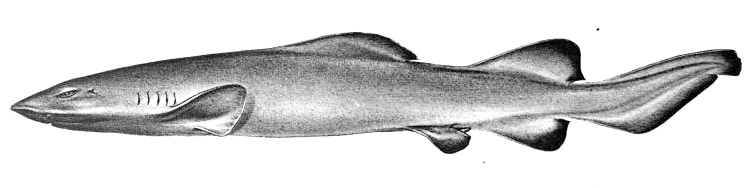
- False catshark (Pseudotriakis microdon)
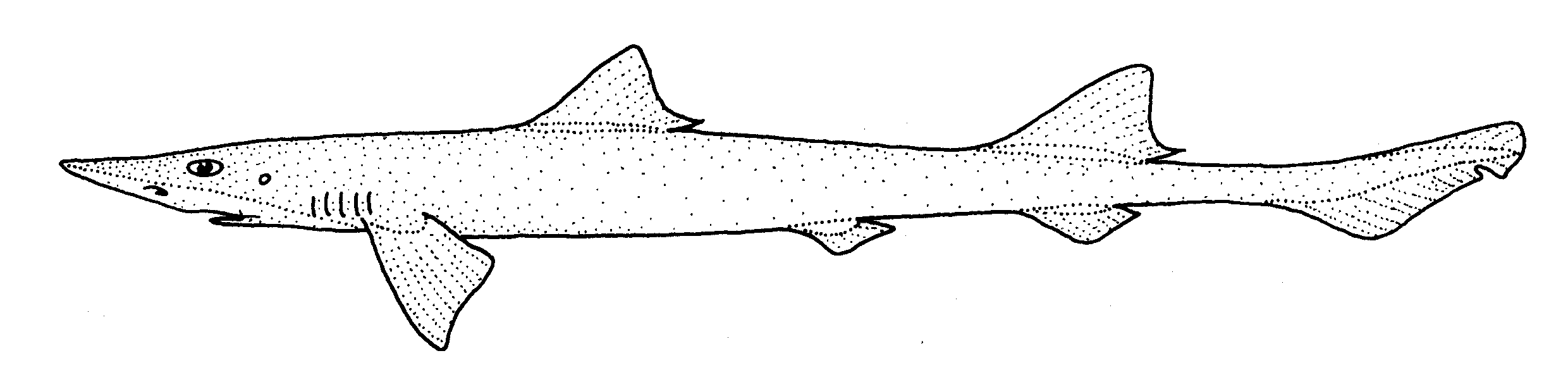
- Slender smooth-hound (Gollum attenuatus)

Scientific classification
- Kingdom: Animalia
- Phylum: Chordata
- Class: Chondrichthyes
- Subclass: Elasmobranchii
- Division: Selachii
- Order: Carcharhiniformes
- Suborder: Carcharhinoidei
- Family: Pseudotriakidae; T. N. Gill, 1893

Genera
- see text

= Pseudotriakidae =

Family of sharks

The Pseudotriakidae are a small family of ground sharks, belonging to the order Carcharhiniformes, containing the false catsharks (genera Pseudotriakis and Planonasus) and gollumsharks (genus Gollum). It contains the only ground shark species that exhibit intrauterine oophagy, in which developing fetuses are nourished by eggs produced by their mother.

== Genera ==
The Pseudotriakidae contains the following genera:

- Gollum Compagno, 1973
- Planonasus Weigmann, Stehmann & Thiel, 2013
- Pseudotriakis Félix António de Brito Capelo, 1868

== Undescribed species ==
One undescribed species is known - one in the genus Gollum, (Gollum sp. B) - the white-marked gollumshark.
