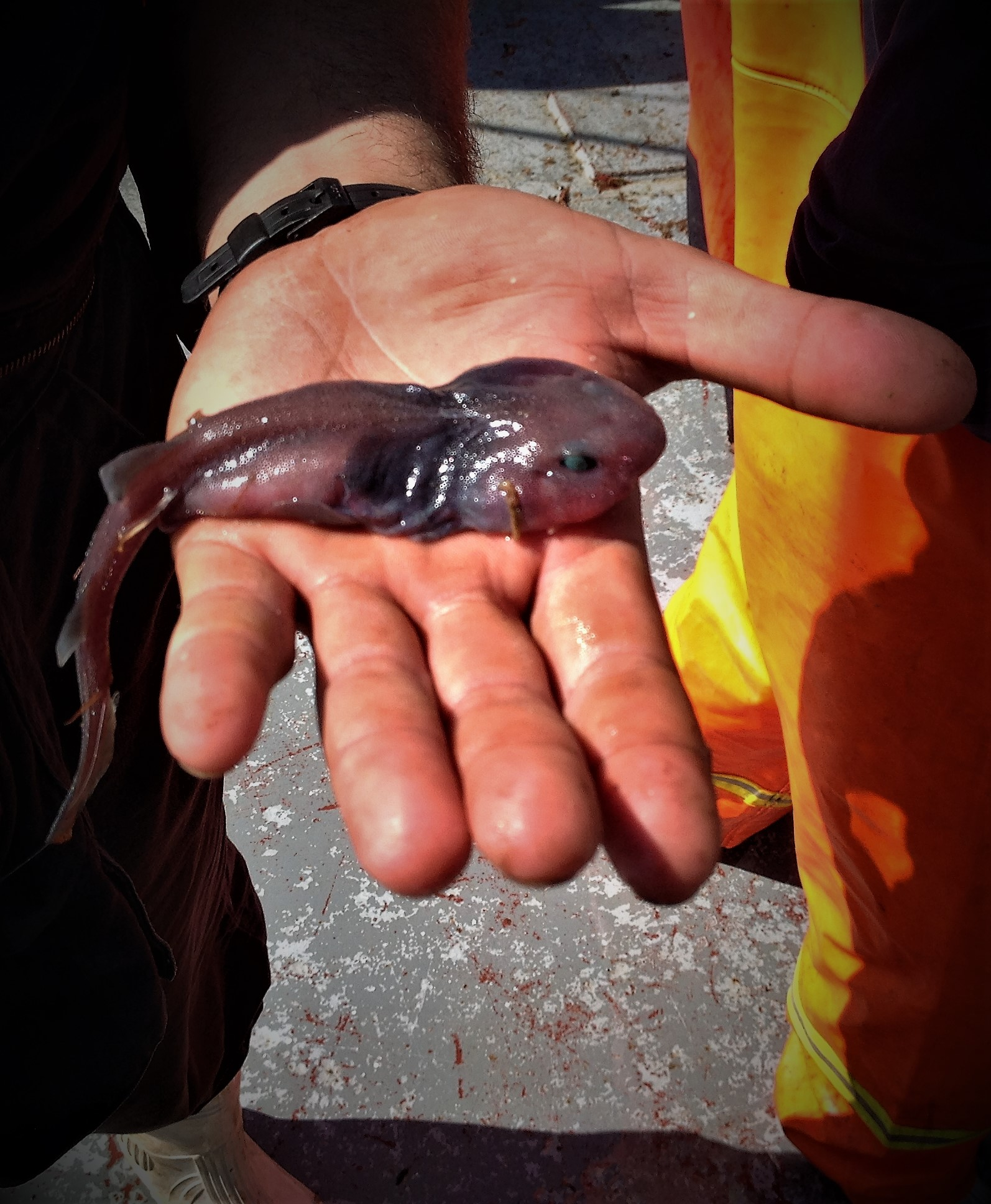

Conservation status
- Least Concern (IUCN 3.1)

Scientific classification
- Kingdom: Animalia
- Phylum: Chordata
- Class: Chondrichthyes
- Subclass: Elasmobranchii
- Division: Selachii
- Order: Carcharhiniformes
- Family: Pentanchidae
- Genus: Cephalurus; Bigelow & Schroeder, 1941
- Species: C. cephalus

Binomial name
- Cephalurus cephalus (C. H. Gilbert, 1892)
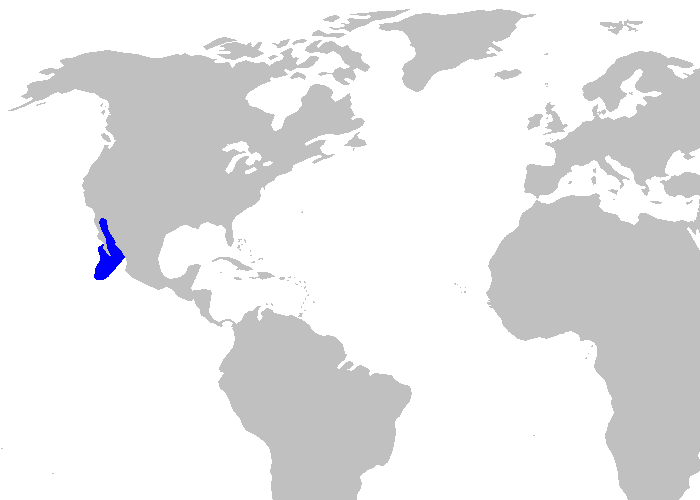

Synonyms
- Catulus cephalus Gilbert, 1892

= Lollipop catshark =

Species of deep-sea catshark

The lollipop catshark (Cephalurus cephalus) is a little-known species of shark belonging to the family Pentanchidae, the deepwater catsharks, and the only described member of its genus. A diminutive, bottom-dwelling shark of the outer continental shelf and upper continental slope, this species can be readily identified by its tadpole-like shape with a greatly expanded, rounded head and narrow body. The large head houses expanded gills, which are thought to be an adaptation for hypoxic conditions. This shark preys on crustaceans and fishes. Reproduction is aplacental viviparous, with females retaining egg cases internally two at a time until they hatch. There is no fishery interest in this species.

== Taxonomy and phylogeny ==
The lollipop catshark was originally described by American ichthyologist Charles Henry Gilbert as Catulus cephalus, in the 1892 14th volume of Proceedings of the United States National Museum. His description was based on a 24 cm (9.4 in) long adult male specimen caught from a depth of 841 m (2,759 ft) off Clarion Island in the Revillagigedo Islands. In 1941, Henry F. Bigelow and William C. Schroeder created the new genus Cephalurus for this species. One or more yet-undescribed species of Cephalurus appear to exist off Panama, Peru, and Chile, which differ slightly from C. cephalus in appearance and size.

Based on morphological and molecular phylogenetic evidence, Cephalurus is thought to form a clade with the genera Asymbolus, Parmaturus, Galeus, and Apristurus. However, different authors disagree on the interrelationships within this group; molecular data supports Cephalurus and Parmaturus as sister groups. This taxon was formerly classified in the family Scyliorhinidae, but, with most of the other genera previously classified within that family, it is now included in the family Pentanchidae.

== Distribution and habitat ==
The range of the lollipop catshark extends from the Gulf of California to off the southern Baja peninsula. This benthic species occurs around the outer continental shelf and upper continental slope at depths of 155–937 m (509–3,074 ft), where it is reportedly abundant.

== Description ==
The lollipop catshark is so named because of its peculiar tadpole-like shape, with an enormously expanded head and branchial region (containing the gills) coupled with a slender, cylindrical body tapering towards the tail. The head is wide, flattened, and rounded, comprising a third of the total length in adults. The snout is very short and blunt, with widely spaced nostrils flanked by moderately developed flaps of skin. The mouth has a pair of furrows at the corners that curl around from the upper to the lower jaw. The widely spaced teeth have a large central cusp flanked by 1–3 cusplets on both sides; the upper teeth are straight while the lower teeth are curved somewhat outward. There are numerous small papillae on the tongue and roof of the mouth, and a light-colored membrane lining the inside of the mouth. The large eyes are oval in shape and followed by prominent spiracles. The five pairs of gill slits are distinctive, being strongly arched forward.

The body is very soft, almost gelatinous. Unlike in other catsharks, the first dorsal fin originates well in front of the pelvic fins. The second dorsal fin is about as long and slightly lower than the first, and is positioned opposite the anal fin. The dorsal, pelvic, and anal fins have convex leading and nearly straight trailing margins. The pectoral fins are angular, twice as long as wide, and originate beneath the fourth gill slit. The caudal fin is low, with an indistinct lower lobe and a shallow ventral notch near the tip of the upper lobe. The skin is delicate and sparsely covered by thornlike dermal denticles interspersed with narrower hair-like denticles that become more numerous on the back. The coloration is a plain brownish gray all over, sometimes lightening to almost white at the dorsal, pectoral, and pelvic fin margins. The eyes are an iridescent green. Adults typically attain a length of 24 cm (9.4 in), but may grow up to 28 cm (11 in) long.

== Biology and ecology ==
The enlarged gill region and expanded gill filaments of the lollipop catshark suggest that it is adapted for living in deep-sea basins with very low levels of dissolved oxygen and perhaps also high temperatures and salinity. This shark feeds mainly on crustaceans, followed by fishes. The lollipop catshark is aplacental viviparous, with birthing apparently taking place in early summer. Females have two functional ovaries and retain pairs of thin-shelled egg cases (one within each oviduct) within their bodies until they hatch. Newborns measure about 10 cm (3.9 in) long; sexual maturation is reached at a length of 19 cm (7.5 in) for males and 24 cm (9.4 in) for females.

== Human interactions ==
The lollipop catshark is of no significance to fisheries. It may be taken as bycatch; though the depths at which it occupies may offer some protection from fishing pressure. The International Union for Conservation of Nature (IUCN) presently assesses it as least concern.
