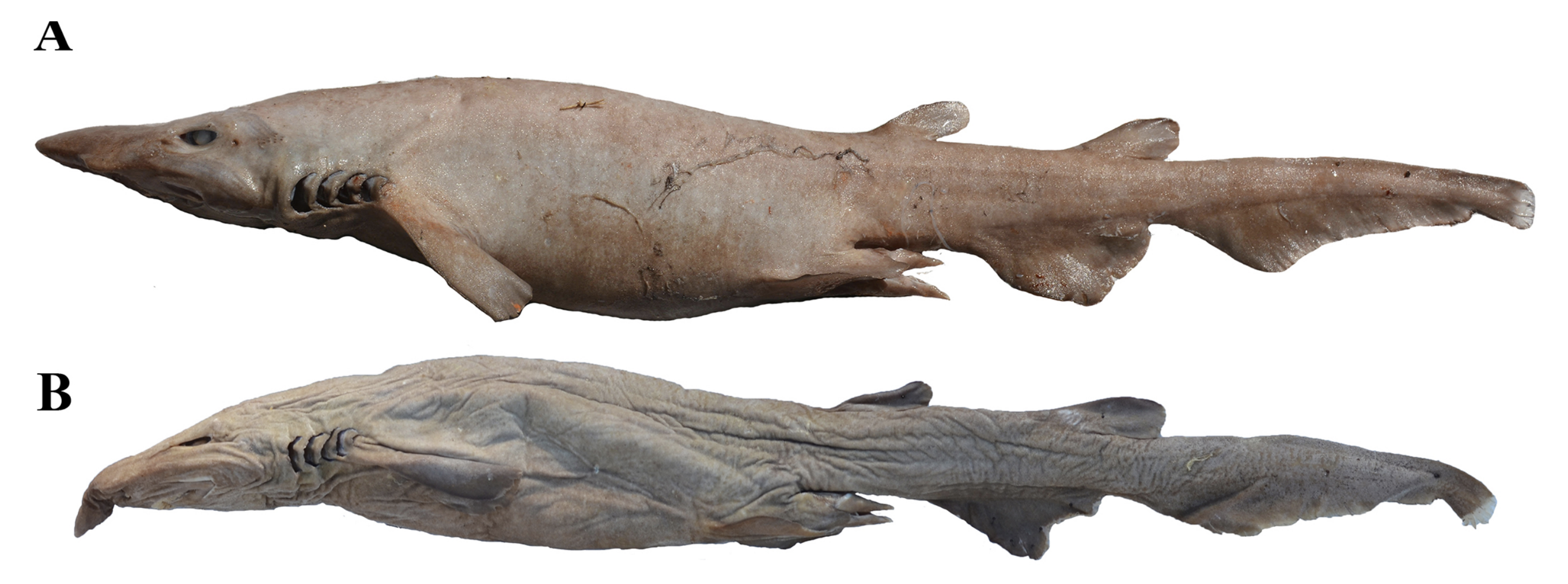

Conservation status
- Least Concern (IUCN 3.1)

Scientific classification
- Kingdom: Animalia
- Phylum: Chordata
- Class: Chondrichthyes
- Subclass: Elasmobranchii
- Division: Selachii
- Order: Carcharhiniformes
- Family: Pentanchidae
- Genus: Apristurus
- Species: A. manocheriani

Binomial name
- Apristurus manocheriani Cordova & Ebert 2021

= Manocherian's catshark =

Species of shark

Manocherian's catshark (Apristurus manocheriani) is a species of shark belonging to the family Pentanchidae, the deepwater catsharks. This species was originally described by Justin A. Cordova and David A. Ebert in 2021.

== Etymology ==
The cat shark is named in honor of Greg Manocherian (b. 1967), an American philanthropist, because of his commitment to shark conservation and research.

== Description ==
The species is a catshark with a "porcelain" white body color with a pink tint, it has a maximum total length of at least 558 mm for males and 495 mm for females.

== Range ==
Apristurus manocheriani is only found in the southwest Indian Ocean

== Taxonomy ==
The species is part of the Apristurus spongiceps subgroup of the genus Apristurus.
