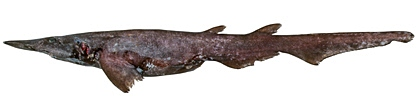

Conservation status
- Least Concern (IUCN 3.1)

Scientific classification
- Kingdom: Animalia
- Phylum: Chordata
- Class: Chondrichthyes
- Subclass: Elasmobranchii
- Division: Selachii
- Order: Carcharhiniformes
- Family: Pentanchidae
- Genus: Apristurus
- Species: A. longicephalus

Binomial name
- Apristurus longicephalus Nakaya, 1975
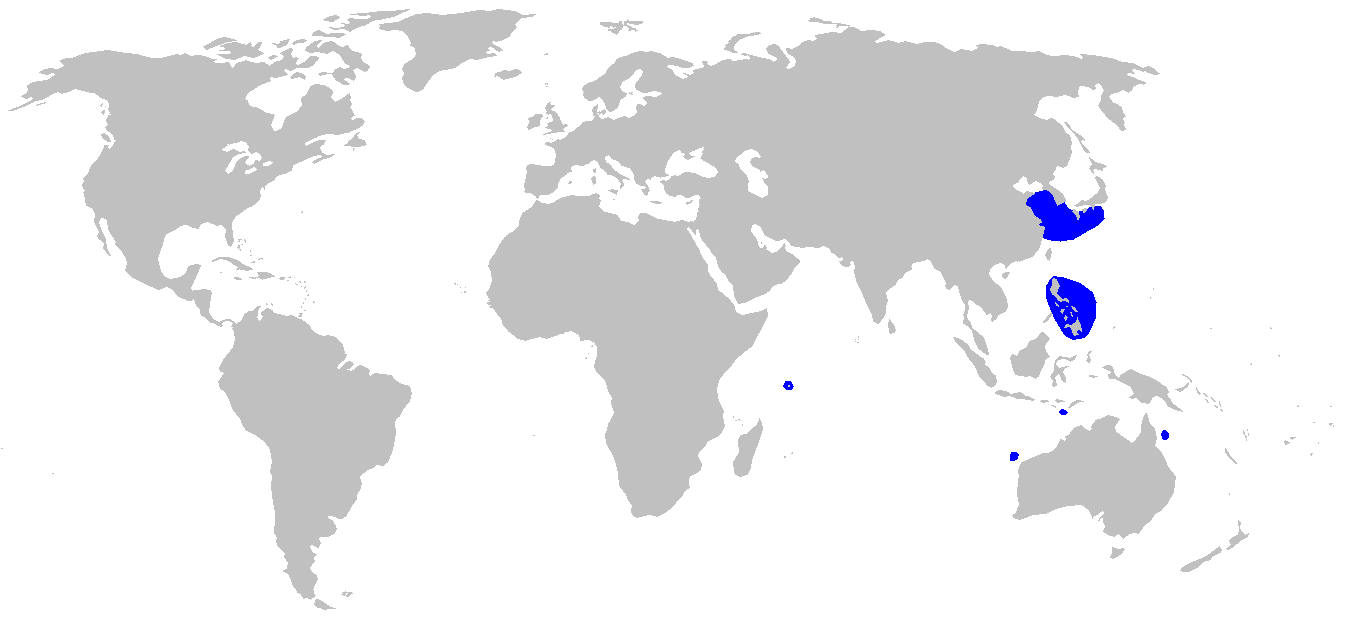
- Range of the longhead catshark

= Longhead catshark =

Species of shark

The longhead catshark or smoothbelly catshark (Apristurus longicephalus) is a species of shark, family Pentanchidae, the deepwater catsharks. This shark has a patchy distribution in the Indo-Pacific from Mozambique to southern Japan to northern Australia. It is found in water between 500 and 1,140 m (1,640 and 3,740 ft) deep. This species grows to 59 cm (23 in) long, and is characterized by its extremely long and narrow snout, short abdomen, and long anal and caudal fins. In addition, a large area of the anterior ventral portion of its body lacks dermal denticles. The longhead catshark is oviparous. It is the only known cartilaginous fish that is normally hermaphroditic, with the majority of individuals having both the functional reproductive organs of one sex and the undeveloped reproductive organs of the opposite sex.

== Taxonomy and phylogeny ==
The first known specimen of the longhead catshark was captured in Tosa Bay, Kōchi Prefecture, Japan, on May 12, 1972. The 38-cm-long specimen was initially thought to be an immature male, but has since been identified as a functionally female hermaphrodite. The new species was described by Kazuhiro Nakaya in a 1975 volume of the scientific journal Memoirs of the Faculty of Fisheries, Hokkaido University. In 1999, Nakaya and Sato grouped this species with the similarly long-snouted longfin catshark (A. herklotsi) in the A. longicephalus species group.

== Distribution and habitat ==
Records of the longhead catshark are patchy and widely spread in the Indo-Pacific region: it is known from the East China Sea, southern Japan, the Seychelles, the Philippines, Mozambique, New Caledonia, and northern Australia off Townsville, Ashmore Reef, and North West Cape. This species inhabits the continental slope at depths of 500–1,140 m (1,640–3,740 ft), and is probably found near the sea floor.

== Description ==
Reaching a length of 59 cm (23 in), the longhead catshark has a soft, very thin body and a long head comprising one-quarter of its total length. The flattened, bell-shaped snout measures roughly 12% of the total length and narrows considerably in front of the nostrils. The oblique nostrils are divided into large, oval incurrent and excurrent openings by triangular flaps of skin on their anterior rims. The small, horizontally oval eyes are somewhat upward-facing, and equipped with rudimentary nictitating membranes. Behind each eye is a modest spiracle. The mouth forms a short, wide arch, with well-developed furrows around the corners. The teeth number 36–44 rows in the upper jaw and over 45 rows in either jaw; each tooth is well-spaced from the next and has three or five cusps, with the central cusp much longer than the others. The five pairs of gill slits are short, with the fourth and fifth pairs over the base of the pectoral fins.

The first dorsal fin has a rounded apex and located over the latter third of the pelvic fin bases. The second dorsal fin is similar in shape but much larger than the first, and located over the latter half of the anal fin base. The pectoral fins are moderately large and broad. The medium-sized, rounded pelvic fins are placed fairly close to the pectoral fins. The anal fin is elongated and angular, and separated from the caudal fin by only a deep notch. The narrow caudal fin comprises about one-third of the total length and has a distinct lower lobe and a ventral notch near the tip of the upper lobe. The tiny, well-spaced dermal denticles, each bearing a median ridge and three posterior points, give the skin a velvety texture. A large patch of naked skin extends from the throat and gill region, around the pectoral fins and over the flank and abdomen, to the space between the pelvic and anal fins. Denticles are also absent near the fin margins. This species is dark brown to blackish in color; the naked patches of skin and the interior of the mouth are black.

== Biology and ecology ==
The longhead catshark is unique among Apristurus species in that the duodenum is not short, but almost as long as the spiral valve intestine. The function of this trait is unknown, as the feeding habits of this shark have not been documented. The longhead catshark is the only known cartilaginous fish that is normally hermaphroditic: some 85% of the population is functionally male or female, but also possesses undeveloped reproductive organs of the opposite sex (called "rudimentary hermaphroditism"). The factors underlying the evolution of this system have yet to be investigated. This species is oviparous; a single partial egg case has been found, which had tendrils on the posterior corners. Males and females attain sexual maturity at lengths of around 42–49 cm (17–19 in) and 51 cm (20 in) long respectively.

== Human interactions ==
The longhead catshark has no known economic value, and as such is not a target of fisheries, though it may be taken as bycatch throughout its range. Even if deepwater fisheries expand, however, the shark would likely to able to elude capture by seeking refuge at greater depths, which is why it has been assessed as Least Concern, even though population data is lacking. Because of its diminutive size and deepwater habitat, it poses no threat to humans.
