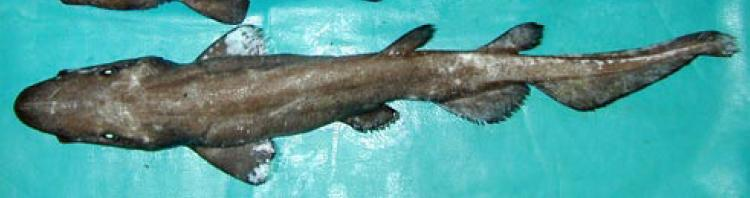

Conservation status
- Least Concern (IUCN 3.1)

Scientific classification
- Kingdom: Animalia
- Phylum: Chordata
- Class: Chondrichthyes
- Subclass: Elasmobranchii
- Division: Selachii
- Order: Carcharhiniformes
- Family: Pentanchidae
- Genus: Apristurus
- Species: A. manis

Binomial name
- Apristurus manis (S. Springer, 1979)
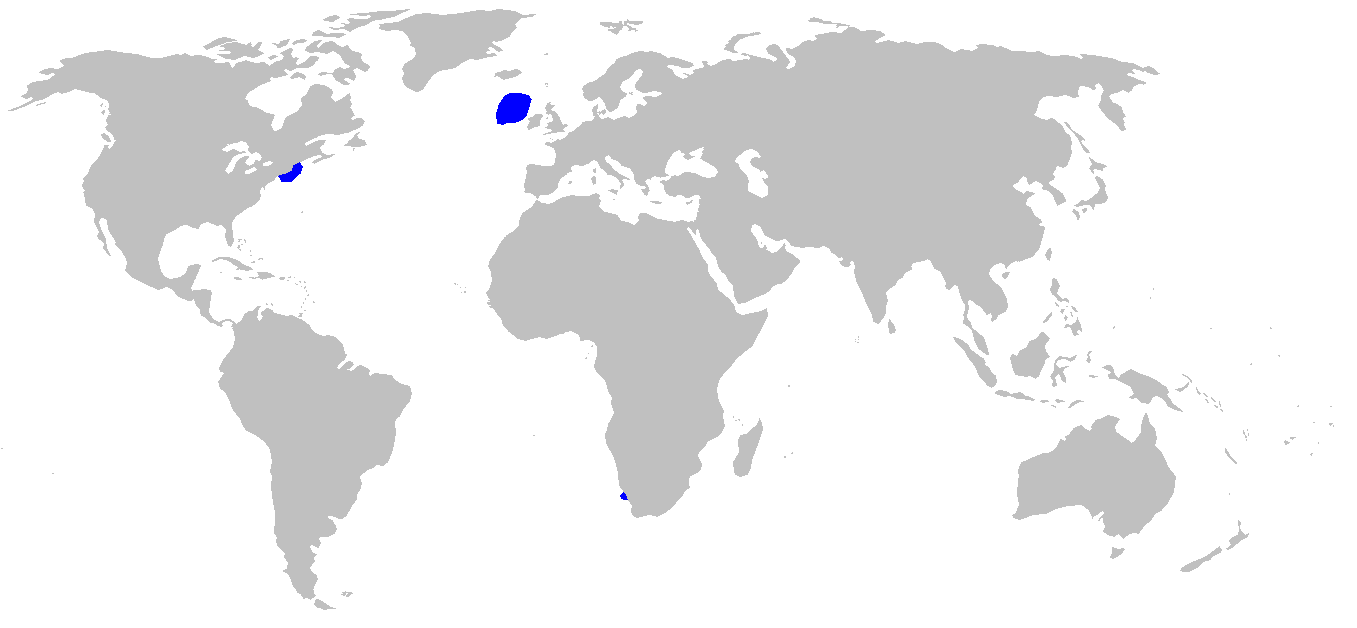

= Ghost catshark =

Species of shark

The ghost catshark (Apristurus manis) is a species of shark belonging to the family Pentanchidae, the deepwater catsharks. This species is found on the continental slopes in the northwest Atlantic off Massachusetts, the northeast Atlantic from the Porcupine Bank west of Ireland and the southern Atlantic off Cape Town, at depths between 600 and 1,900 metres (2,000 and 6,200 ft).

== Description ==
The ghost catshark can grow up to 85 centimetres (33 in) in length and reaches maturity at a length of 75 centimetres (30 in) for females.

== Distribution ==
The ghost catshark is a demersal (bottom-loving) species living just above the seabed in deep water in the Atlantic Ocean between 40° and 60° North. It is present on the continental slopes off Massachusetts in the United States and on the Porcupine Bank west of Ireland. A reported sighting of the deep-water catshark (Apristurus profundorum) off Mauritania may have in fact been this species. It is also reported from deep water in the vicinity of Cape Town in South Africa.

== Biology ==
The reproduction of the ghost catshark is oviparous. The eggs are laid in pairs and the growing young subsist entirely on the egg-yolk until they hatch.

== Status ==
Very little is known of the biology of this deep water shark, but it is sometimes caught by research vessels. It lives below the depth range at which fishing is normally undertaken but it may be caught as bycatch in some deep water trawling activities, and it may be threatened in the future by an expansion of deep-water fisheries. The International Union for Conservation of Nature has assessed its conservation status for the time being as being of "least concern".
