= Galbraith's catshark =

Scientific classification
- Domain: Eukaryota
- Kingdom: Animalia
- Phylum: Chordata
- Class: Chondrichthyes
- Subclass: Elasmobranchii
- Division: Selachii
- Order: Carcharhiniformes
- Family: Pentanchidae
- Genus: Apristurus
- Species: A. sp. X

Binomial name
- Apristurus sp. X

Species of cartilaginous fish

Galbraith's catshark (Apristurus sp. X) is an undescribed species of soft-bodied catshark in the family Scyliorhinidae with only one known specimen found.

== Description ==
The shark is elongated in appearance. It has a relatively short snout. The anal fin is relatively short and the pectoral fins are low down. On its ventral snout, there are oval-shaped series of ampullae of Lorenzini. The shark is uniformly brown.

The specimen caught was 58 cm (23 in) long.

== Distribution and habitat ==
The species lives in very deep water, the only specimen was caught at the Bear Seamount in the north-western Atlantic Ocean at a depth of 1,800 m (5,900 ft).

== Similar species ==
It is most similar to the black roughscale catshark (Apristurus melanoasper), but Galbraith's catshark is smaller, the anal fin is shorter, the shape is different and the denticles are of different sizes.
