= Shortbelly catshark =

Conservation status
- Least Concern (IUCN 3.1)

Scientific classification
- Kingdom: Animalia
- Phylum: Chordata
- Class: Chondrichthyes
- Subclass: Elasmobranchii
- Division: Selachii
- Order: Carcharhiniformes
- Family: Pentanchidae
- Genus: Apristurus
- Species: A. breviventralis

Binomial name
- Apristurus breviventralis Kawauchi, Weigmann & Nakaya, 2014

Species of shark

The shortbelly catshark (Apristurus breviventralis) is a shark of the family Pentanchidae, the deepwater catsharks. It is found in the Gulf of Aden, Indian Ocean. This species most closely resembles the western Atlantic species Apristurus canutus, but is distinguishable in having greater nostril length than internarial width and longer claspers in adult males.
