= Ridged-egg catshark =

Scientific classification
- Kingdom: Animalia
- Phylum: Chordata
- Class: Chondrichthyes
- Subclass: Elasmobranchii
- Division: Selachii
- Order: Carcharhiniformes
- Family: Pentanchidae
- Genus: Apristurus
- Species: A. ovicorrugatus

Binomial name
- Apristurus ovicorrugatus White, O'Neill, Devloo-Delva, Nakaya & Iglésias, 2023

Species of shark

The ridged-egg catshark (Apristurus ovicorrugatus) is a species of shark belonging to the family Pentanchidae, the deepwater catsharks. This shark is found in the deep waters off northwestern Australia. The species name refers to the ridges on the egg case. Egg cases belonging to this species had been documented as early as the 1980s, but could not be matched to any species of Australian shark until scientists examined a shark specimen of previously uncertain identity in the CSIRO collection. The holotype is a gravid female collected northwest of the Dampier Archipelago, Western Australia, in 1992.
