= Asymbolus parvus =

Dwarf catshark

Conservation status
- Least Concern (IUCN 3.1)

Scientific classification
- Kingdom: Animalia
- Phylum: Chordata
- Class: Chondrichthyes
- Subclass: Elasmobranchii
- Division: Selachii
- Order: Carcharhiniformes
- Family: Pentanchidae
- Genus: Asymbolus
- Species: A. parvus

Binomial name
- Asymbolus parvus Compagno, Stevens & Last, 1999

Species of shark

The dwarf catshark (Asymbolus parvus) is a species of shark belonging to the family Pentanchidae, the deepwater catsharks. This shark is found only off the coast of Western Australia, at depths between 200 and 400 m (660 and 1,310 ft). Its length is up to 44 cm (17 in).
