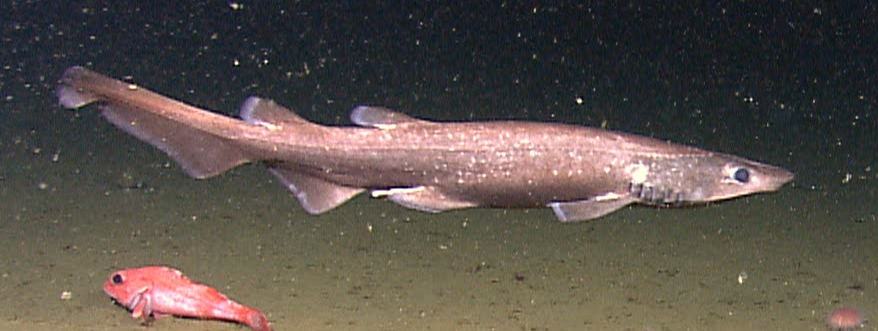

Conservation status
- Least Concern (IUCN 3.1)

Scientific classification
- Kingdom: Animalia
- Phylum: Chordata
- Class: Chondrichthyes
- Subclass: Elasmobranchii
- Division: Selachii
- Order: Carcharhiniformes
- Family: Pentanchidae
- Genus: Apristurus
- Species: A. brunneus

Binomial name
- Apristurus brunneus (C. H. Gilbert, 1892)
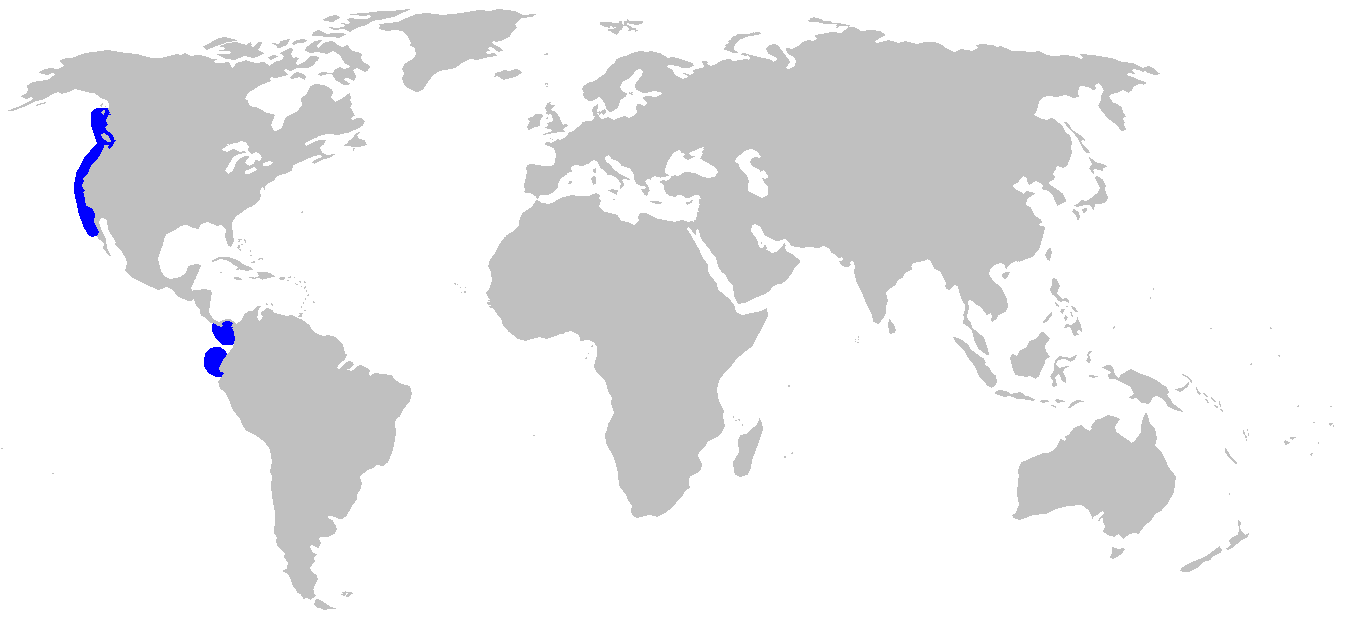

= Brown catshark =

Species of shark

The brown catshark (Apristurus brunneus) is commonly found in the Pacific Ocean, ranging from the northern Pacific waters off the coast of British Columbia and south to the Baja California peninsula in Mexico. They may live as far south as Ecuador and Peru. Brown catsharks are deep-water sharks that live on the outer continental shelf and the upper slope. They have been known to live at depths ranging from 30 to 650 m and live on the bottom, usually in muddy or sandy areas. The brown catshark, when originally described, was called Catulus brunneus.

== Description ==
Brown catsharks have long, slender bodies with broad, bell-shaped snouts. They are dark brown with light-colored markings on the posterior margins of their fins. Their bodies are soft and flabby, with a weak skin that can easily be harmed. Brown catsharks' two dorsal fins are the same size and do not have spines. The first dorsal fin originates to the front of the pelvic fin and the second dorsal fin is located in front of the anal fin's insertion. They typically reach a maximum size of 68 cm in total length, but they average between 30 and 60 cm.

== Behavior ==
Very little is known about the behavior of brown catsharks; they are believed to be solitary, nocturnal creatures. They are thought to be migratory, but most of the year near the edge of the continental shelf.

Communication specific to brown catsharks is unknown. However, as with most other sharks, including other members of the family Scyliorhinidae, they are believed to have a well-developed sense of smell, and are electroreceptive, which allows them to detect electricity emitted by other animals, and may also allow them to detect magnetic fields, which aides in navigation.

== Food habits and predation ==
Brown catsharks feed on many bottom-dwelling species, including small shrimp, euphausiids, squid, and small fish. It is unknown whether brown catsharks are important predators within their ecosystem.

== Reproduction ==
Reproduction in brown catsharks is oviparous, with a single egg at a time per oviduct. Egg cases are usually about 5 cm long and 2.5 cm wide. The egg cases are transparent and have long tendrils that are probably used to attach them to hard structures. The incubation period is possibly a year. In Canadian waters, females carry egg cases from February to August; however, the carrying time for warmer waters is unknown.

== Conservation status and economic impact ==
Brown catsharks are not listed as endangered on the IUCN Red List or the CITES list. They are not known to be a vulnerable or threatened species. They are, however, listed on the IUCN list as needing to be reclassified. The only known negative impact that brown catsharks have on humans is the frequent bycatch of deep-water fishing trawlers, which while not economically significant, can cause damage to nets, as well as time lost in removing the bycatch from the viable catch.

== Sources ==
- Compagno, L.J.V., 1984. FAO species catalogue. Vol. 4. Sharks of the world. An annotated and illustrated catalogue of shark species known to date. Part 2 - Carcharhiniformes.. FAO Fish. Synop. 125(4/2):251-655.
- Shark Foundation. 2006. "Brown catshark (Apristurus brunneus)" (On-line). Accessed April 6, 2006 at http://www.shark.ch/Database/Search/species.html?sh_id=1189
