= Yang's longnose catshark =

Conservation status
- Least Concern (IUCN 3.1)

Scientific classification
- Kingdom: Animalia
- Phylum: Chordata
- Class: Chondrichthyes
- Subclass: Elasmobranchii
- Division: Selachii
- Order: Carcharhiniformes
- Family: Pentanchidae
- Genus: Apristurus
- Species: A. yangi

Binomial name
- Apristurus yangi White, Mana & Naylor, 2017

Species of fish

Apristurus yangi, or Yang's longnose catshark, is a type of deepwater catshark found exclusively in the waters of Papua New Guinea. It is identified from just a single female specimen ever caught in the region mentioned.

== Description ==
This catshark has several distinguishing characteristics, such as long slender head, very elongated snout, wide mouth, large anal fin, blackish snout tip, and absence of enlarged denticles on the caudal fin. The only specimen ever collected, which is an adult pregnant female, has a maximum total length of 43.7 cm. The egg case is around 6 cm long and has vague longitudinal striations.

== Distribution and habitat ==
This species is believed to inhabit the Bismarck Archipelago, north-east of Papua New Guinea. It might live in the depths of 630–786 m.

There are currently no documented deepwater fisheries in the region, making this catshark not prone to any threats, and its population remains stable.
