= Japanese catshark =

Conservation status
- Least Concern (IUCN 3.1)

Scientific classification
- Kingdom: Animalia
- Phylum: Chordata
- Class: Chondrichthyes
- Subclass: Elasmobranchii
- Division: Selachii
- Order: Carcharhiniformes
- Family: Pentanchidae
- Genus: Apristurus
- Species: A. japonicus

Binomial name
- Apristurus japonicus Nakaya, 1975
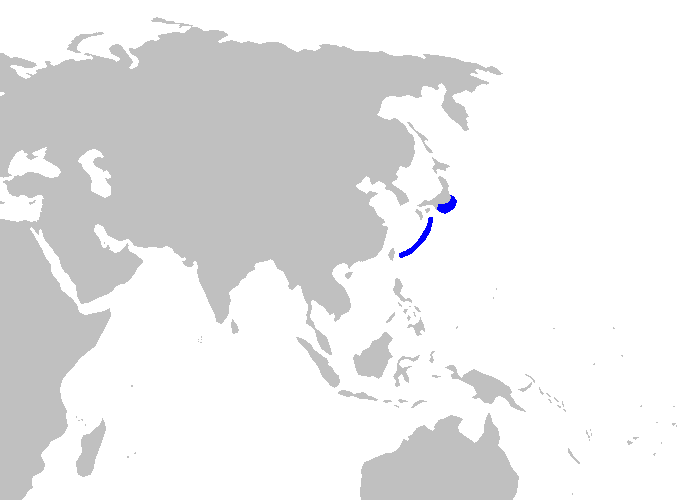

Species of shark

The Japanese catshark (Apristurus japonicus) is a shark of the family Pentanchidae, the deepwater catsharks, found in the northwest Pacific off Chiba Prefecture, Honshū, Japan, between 36 and 34°N. This shark has a relatively slender body, with the trunk tapering towards the head. Its snout is moderately long, bell-shaped, and broad; the preoral snout is about 7% to 8% of its total length. It has large gill slits, rather small eyes in adults, nostrils fairly broad, and a long broad, arched mouth. It is commonly taken by trawl off the type locality, and possibly used for oil, human consumption, and fishmeal or fish cakes locally.
