= Broadgill catshark =

Conservation status
- Least Concern (IUCN 3.1)

Scientific classification
- Kingdom: Animalia
- Phylum: Chordata
- Class: Chondrichthyes
- Subclass: Elasmobranchii
- Division: Selachii
- Order: Carcharhiniformes
- Family: Pentanchidae
- Genus: Apristurus
- Species: A. riveri

Binomial name
- Apristurus riveri Bigelow & Schroeder, 1944
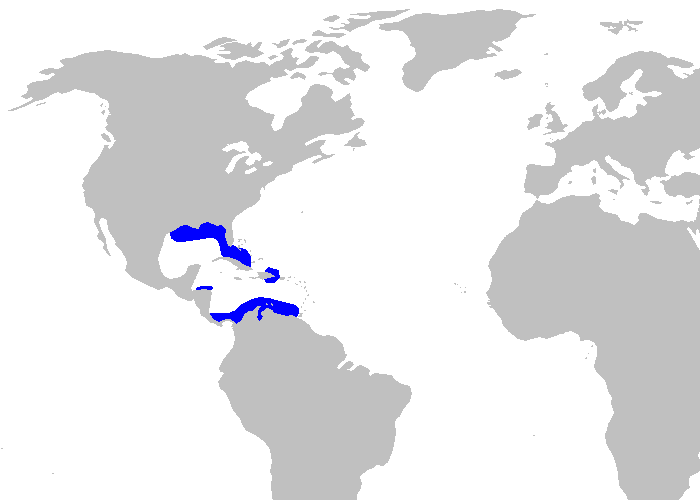

Species of shark

The broadgill catshark (Apristurus riveri) is a species of shark belonging to the family Pentanchidae, the deepwater catsharks. This shark is found in the Gulf of Mexico and the Caribbean Sea, between 30°N and 9° N, on the continental slopes at depths between 700 and 1,500 m. Its length is up to 46 cm. The reproduction of the broadgill catshark is oviparous.

This species is benthic, it ranges from Florida, Cuba, and Hispaniola and along the Central American coast south to Venezuela. The broadgill catshark's eggs are smooth-surfaced, translucent, greenish with indistinct bands of lighter color.
