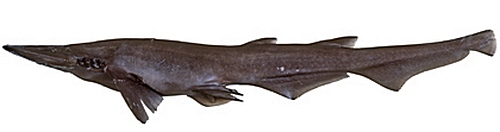

Conservation status
- Least Concern (IUCN 3.1)

Scientific classification
- Kingdom: Animalia
- Phylum: Chordata
- Class: Chondrichthyes
- Subclass: Elasmobranchii
- Division: Selachii
- Order: Carcharhiniformes
- Family: Pentanchidae
- Genus: Apristurus
- Species: A. platyrhynchus

Binomial name
- Apristurus platyrhynchus (S. Tanaka (I), 1909)
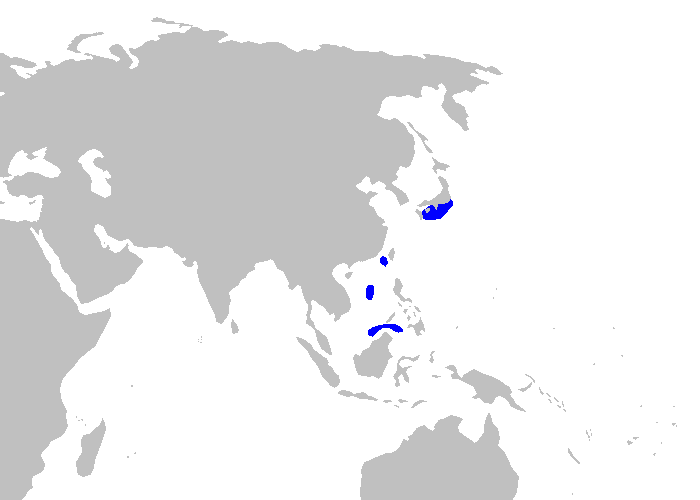

= Spatulasnout catshark =

Species of shark

The spatulasnout catshark (Apristurus platyrhynchus), also known as the Borneo catshark or flatnose catshark, is a species of shark belonging to the family Pentanchidae, the deepwater catshark. This shark is found in the western Pacific between 35°N and 1° N. Its length is up to 80 cm (31 in).
