= Pinocchio catshark =

Conservation status
- Least Concern (IUCN 3.1)

Scientific classification
- Kingdom: Animalia
- Phylum: Chordata
- Class: Chondrichthyes
- Subclass: Elasmobranchii
- Division: Selachii
- Order: Carcharhiniformes
- Family: Pentanchidae
- Genus: Apristurus
- Species: A. australis

Binomial name
- Apristurus australis Sato, Nakaya & Yorozu, 2008

Species of shark

The Pinocchio catshark (Apristurus australis) is a species of catshark in the family Pentanchidae, the deepwater catsharks. This species is found in Australia and possibly New Zealand. Its natural habitat is the open seas. It belongs to a genus of poorly known deep-water sharks. Very little is known of its biology. Possibly a widely distributed deep-water catshark found along the Australian continental slope at depths of 590 to 1,000 m, it consists of several distinct populations which may be separate species. Although part of the distribution includes heavily fished areas, particularly off southeastern Australia, much of its range is in unfished areas. Given the taxonomic uncertainty of the separate populations, it is not possible to assess the conservation status of this species at this time. However, deep-water demersal trawl fisheries are expanding in the region, and the situation should be reassessed following taxonomic clarification.
