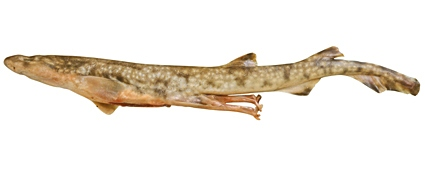

Conservation status
- Least Concern (IUCN 3.1)

Scientific classification
- Kingdom: Animalia
- Phylum: Chordata
- Class: Chondrichthyes
- Subclass: Elasmobranchii
- Division: Selachii
- Order: Carcharhiniformes
- Family: Pentanchidae
- Genus: Asymbolus
- Species: A. vincenti

Binomial name
- Asymbolus vincenti (Zietz (fi), 1908)
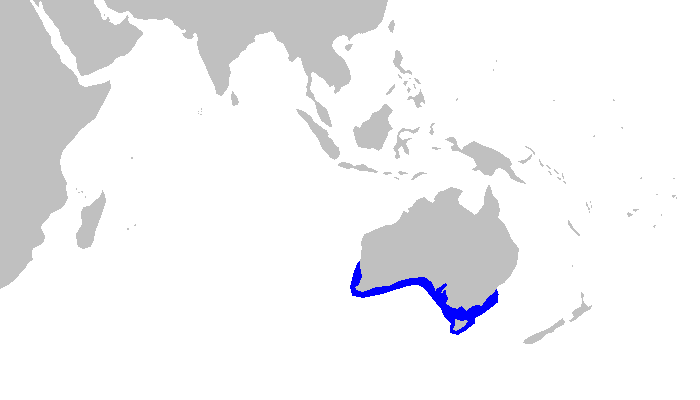

Synonyms
- Scyllium vincenti Zietz, 1908; Halaelurus vincenti (Zietz, 1908); Juncrus vincenti (Zietz, 1908)

= Gulf catshark =

Species of shark

The Gulf catshark (Asymbolus vincenti) is a species of shark belonging to the family Pentanchidae, the deepwater catsharks. This shark is found only off the shores of southern Australia at depths between 27 and 650 metres (89 and 2,133 ft). This species can reach a length of 61 centimetres (24 in) TL.
