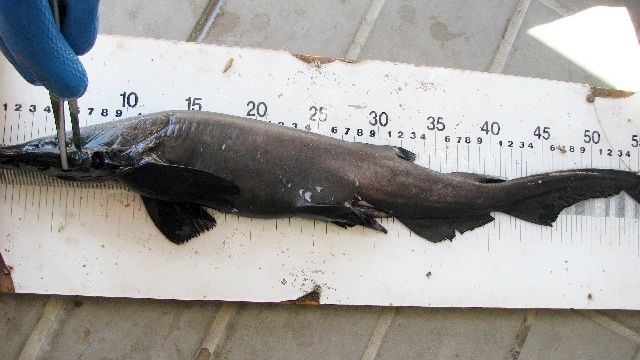

Conservation status
- Least Concern (IUCN 3.1)

Scientific classification
- Kingdom: Animalia
- Phylum: Chordata
- Class: Chondrichthyes
- Subclass: Elasmobranchii
- Division: Selachii
- Order: Carcharhiniformes
- Family: Pentanchidae
- Genus: Apristurus
- Species: A. saldanha

Binomial name
- Apristurus saldanha (Barnard, 1925)
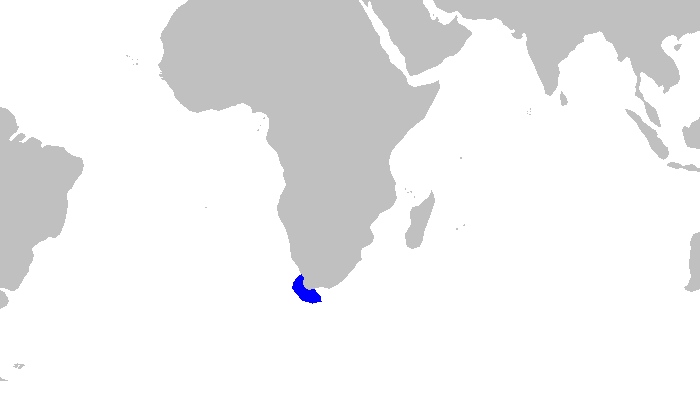
- Range of the Saldanha catshark

= Saldanha catshark =

Species of shark

The Saldanha catshark (Apristurus saldanha) is a species of shark belonging to the family Pentanchidae, the deepwater catsharks. This catshark is found from Cape Columbine to south of False Bay in South Africa, between 31 and 40°S. Its length is up to 88 cm (35 in). It is a plain, dark grey-brown, stout catshark, with moderately large eyes, a broad snout, and large pectoral fins.
