= Garrick's catshark =

Conservation status
- Least Concern (IUCN 3.1)

Scientific classification
- Kingdom: Animalia
- Phylum: Chordata
- Class: Chondrichthyes
- Subclass: Elasmobranchii
- Division: Selachii
- Order: Carcharhiniformes
- Family: Pentanchidae
- Genus: Apristurus
- Species: A. garricki

Binomial name
- Apristurus garricki Sato, A. L. Stewart & Nakaya, 2013

Species of shark

Garrick's catshark (Apristurus garricki) is a species of shark in the family Pentanchidae, the deepwater catsharks. This species is found in the waters of New Zealand. Its natural habitat is the open seas. The new deep-water catshark, Apristurus garricki, is described from the waters of northern New Zealand. It is named in honour of Jack Garrick.

== Conservation status ==
The IUCN Red List classifies the Garrick's catshark as being of least concern.

The New Zealand Department of Conservation has classified the Garrick's catshark as "Data deficient" under the New Zealand Threat Classification System.
