= Fedorov's catshark =

Conservation status
- Least Concern (IUCN 3.1)

Scientific classification
- Kingdom: Animalia
- Phylum: Chordata
- Class: Chondrichthyes
- Subclass: Elasmobranchii
- Division: Selachii
- Order: Carcharhiniformes
- Family: Pentanchidae
- Genus: Apristurus
- Species: A. fedorovi

Binomial name
- Apristurus fedorovi Dolganov, 1985
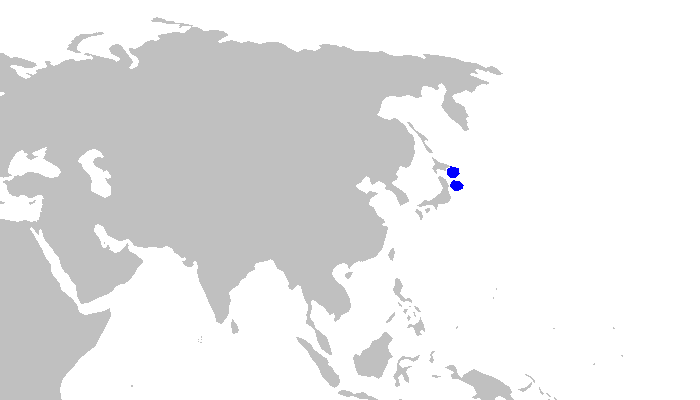

Species of shark

Fedorov's catshark (Apristurus fedorovi) is a shark of the family Pentanchidae, the deepwater catsharks. This shark has oviparous reproduction. This is a very poorly known species, with less than 30 specimens reported in the scientific literature. Almost nothing is known of its biology. This species may be endemic to northern Japanese waters, where it is taken in water around 1,200 m (3937 ft) deep. However, accurate identification of Apristurus species is particularly difficult, and further research is required to determine its geographical and bathymetrical distribution.
