= Panama ghost catshark =

Conservation status
- Least Concern (IUCN 3.1)

Scientific classification
- Kingdom: Animalia
- Phylum: Chordata
- Class: Chondrichthyes
- Subclass: Elasmobranchii
- Division: Selachii
- Order: Carcharhiniformes
- Family: Pentanchidae
- Genus: Apristurus
- Species: A. stenseni

Binomial name
- Apristurus stenseni (S. Springer, 1979)
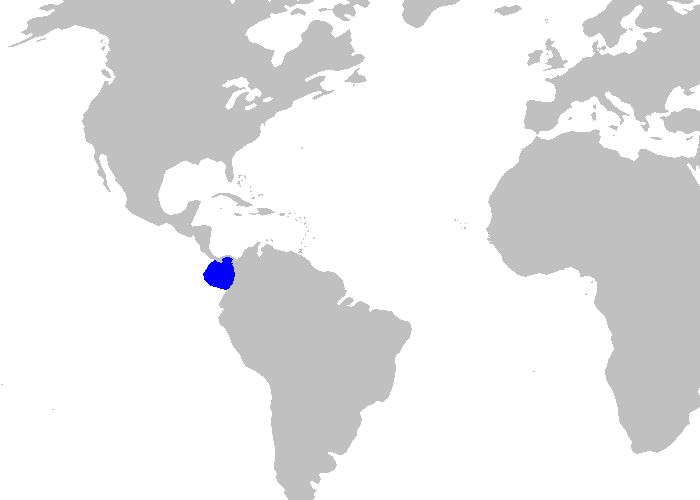

Species of shark

The Panama ghost catshark (Apristurus stenseni) is a species of shark belonging to the family Pentanchidae, the deepwater catsharks. This little known catshark is only found off Panama, between 9°N and 2°N. The reproduction of the Panama ghost shark is oviparous.

== Etymology ==
The catshark is named in honor of Danish geologist and anatomist Niels Stensen (1638-1686), also known as Nicolas Steno.
