= Roughskin catshark =

Conservation status
- Least Concern (IUCN 3.1)

Scientific classification
- Kingdom: Animalia
- Phylum: Chordata
- Class: Chondrichthyes
- Subclass: Elasmobranchii
- Division: Selachii
- Order: Carcharhiniformes
- Family: Pentanchidae
- Genus: Apristurus
- Species: A. ampliceps

Binomial name
- Apristurus ampliceps Sasahara, Sato & Nakaya, 2008

Species of shark

The roughskin catshark (Apristurus ampliceps) is a species of catshark in the family Pentanchidae, the deepwater catsharks. This species is found near Australia and New Zealand. Its natural habitat is the open seas. This species belongs to a genus of poorly known deep-water catsharks.

This species was first described in 2008 by Ryohei Sasahara, Keiichi Sato & Kazuhiro Nakaya.

Very little is known of its biology. This species is known to occur in deep water (840 to 1,380 m) off New Zealand, sporadic sites around Tasmania, and a small area of Western Australia. Some concern exists for this species, as its distribution includes some heavily fished areas. Deep-water demersal trawl fisheries are expanding in the region, and assuming its biology is like other deep-water shark species, it may not be sufficiently fecund to withstand the exploitation pressure.

== Conservation status ==
The New Zealand Department of Conservation has classified the roughskin catshark as "Data deficient" under the New Zealand Threat Classification System.
