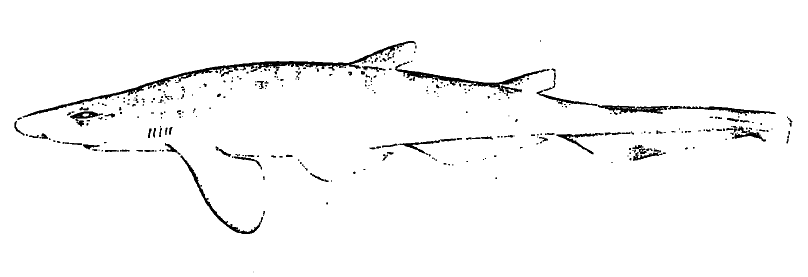

Conservation status
- Least Concern (IUCN 3.1)

Scientific classification
- Kingdom: Animalia
- Phylum: Chordata
- Class: Chondrichthyes
- Subclass: Elasmobranchii
- Division: Selachii
- Order: Carcharhiniformes
- Family: Pentanchidae
- Genus: Galeus
- Species: G. cadenati

Binomial name
- Galeus cadenati S. Springer, 1966
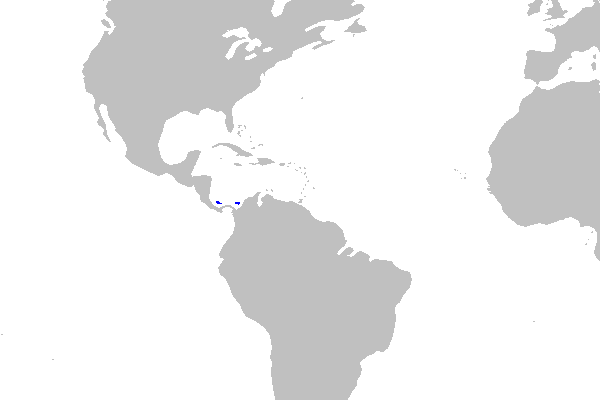
- Range of the longfin sawtail catshark

= Longfin sawtail catshark =

Species of shark

The longfin sawtail catshark (Galeus cadenati) is a rare, little-known species of deepwater catshark., part of the family Pentanchidae. Once thought to be a subspecies of the roughtail catshark (G. arae) along with the Antilles catshark (G. antillensis), it inhabits deep water off the Caribbean coasts of Panama and Colombia. This slim-bodied species has a marbled dorsal color pattern and a prominent crest of enlarged dermal denticles along the dorsal edge of its caudal fin. It can be distinguished from similar species by its relatively longer anal fin and small adult length of under 35 cm (14 in). The longfin sawtail catshark is oviparous.

== Taxonomy ==
Renowned shark expert Stewart Springer described the longfin sawtail catshark in a 1966 issue of the United States Fish and Wildlife Service Fishery Bulletin, based on a 31 cm (12 in) long female collected off Panama on May 30, 1962. He named the species after French zoologist Jean Cadenat, who described the similar African sawtail catshark (G. polli). Springer and other authors would subsequently come to regard G. cadenati as a subspecies of the roughtail catshark (G. arae). In 1998 and 2000, Hera Konstantinou and colleagues published revisions of the G. arae species complex in which they elevated G. a. cadenati back to the rank of full species, along with the other subspecies G. a. antillensis.

== Distribution and habitat ==
The longfin sawtail catshark does not co-occur with either G. arae or G. antillensis. It has only been found in the Caribbean Sea off Panama and Colombia, though confusion with its sister species could have obscured the full extent of its distribution. Demersal in nature, it is a rare inhabitant of the upper continental slope, at depths of 431 to 549 m (1,414 to 1,801 ft).

== Description ==
The longfin sawtail catshark reaches a maximum known length of 35 cm (14 in), smaller than G. antillensis and comparable to G. arae. This species is slender, with a broad head and a moderately long, pointed snout. The large eyes are horizontally oval, equipped with rudimentary nictitating membranes (protective third eyelids), and lack prominent ridges underneath. A modest spiracle is located behind each eye. The nostrils are large and partially covered by anterior triangular flaps of skin. The mouth is wide and curved, with fairly long furrows around the corners. The teeth have a long central cusp flanked on either side by one or two pairs of lateral cusplets. The upper jaw of the type specimen contained 62 tooth rows. The five pairs of gill slits are small, with the fourth and fifth pairs located over the pectoral fin bases.

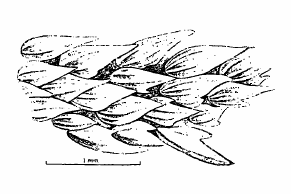
Close-up of the denticle crest along the dorsal caudal fin margin of the longfin sawtail catshark.

The two dorsal fins are similar in size and shape, with blunt apexes. The first dorsal fin originates over the midpoint of the pelvic fin bases, while the second originates over the midpoint of the anal fin base. The pectoral fins are large and broad, with rounded corners. The pelvic and anal fins are low and angular in shape. The anal fin base is distinctively long compared to the other members of the G. arae complex, measuring 13–16% of the total length. The caudal fin has a small, rounded lower lobe and a ventral notch near the tip of the upper lobe. The body is covered by small, overlapping dermal denticles, each with a leaf-shaped crown bearing a horizontal ridge and three marginal teeth. A series of enlarged denticles form an obvious saw-toothed crest along the anterior dorsal edge of the caudal fin. This species is brownish above, with a marbled pattern of darker saddles and blotches along the body and tail that become indistinct past the origin of the first dorsal fin. The underside is uniformly light, and the inside of the mouth is dark.

== Biology and ecology ==
Little is known of the natural history of the longfin sawtail catshark. Reproduction is oviparous; mature females have a single functional ovary, on the right, and two functional oviducts. A single egg matures within each oviduct at a time. The egg is enclosed within a flask-shaped capsule roughly 4.9–5.1 cm (1.9–2.0 in) long, 1.2–1.4 cm (0.47–0.55 in) across the top, and 1.6 cm (0.63 in) across the bottom; there are coiled tendrils at the upper two corners. Females mature at about 29–34 cm (11–13 in) long; adult males are unknown and the largest known immature male measured 29 cm (11 in) long.

== Human interactions ==
The longfin sawtail catshark may be caught incidentally in bottom trawls meant for shrimp, though no specific information is available. Its small range potentially renders it susceptible to overfishing. The International Union for Conservation of Nature (IUCN) has listed this species as least concern.
