= Longnose catshark =

Conservation status
- Data Deficient (IUCN 3.1)

Scientific classification
- Kingdom: Animalia
- Phylum: Chordata
- Class: Chondrichthyes
- Subclass: Elasmobranchii
- Division: Selachii
- Order: Carcharhiniformes
- Family: Pentanchidae
- Genus: Apristurus
- Species: A. kampae

Binomial name
- Apristurus kampae L. R. Taylor, 1972
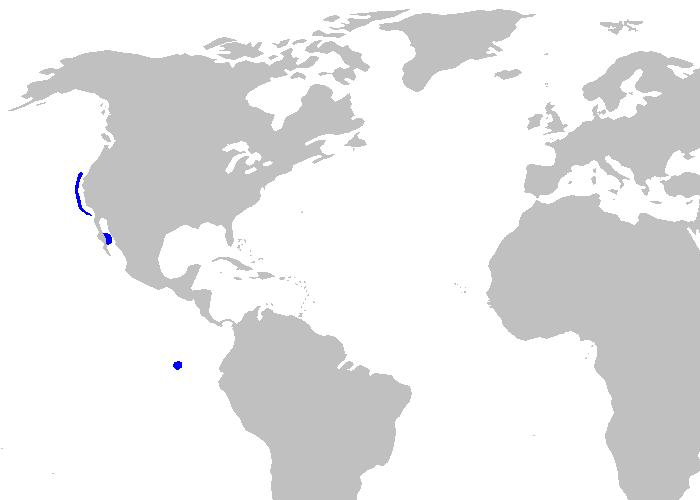

Species of shark

The longnose catshark (Apristurus kampae) is a species of shark belonging to the family Pentanchidae, the deepwater catsharks. This shark is found in the eastern central Pacific from central and southern California and the Gulf of California, between latitudes 38° N and 23° N, at depths down to 1,890. Its length is up to 58 cm.

== Etymology ==
The catshark is named in honor of Elizabeth Kampa Boden (1922–1986), of the Scripps Institution of Oceanography, who was chief scientist aboard RV Argos, from which the type specimen was collected.
