= Starry catshark =

Conservation status
- Least Concern (IUCN 3.1)

Scientific classification
- Kingdom: Animalia
- Phylum: Chordata
- Class: Chondrichthyes
- Subclass: Elasmobranchii
- Division: Selachii
- Order: Carcharhiniformes
- Family: Pentanchidae
- Genus: Asymbolus
- Species: A. galacticus

Binomial name
- Asymbolus galacticus Séret & Last, 2008

Species of fish

The starry catshark (Asymbolus galacticus) is a species of shark belonging to the family Pentanchidae, the deepwater catsharks. This species is found in New Caledonia.

Catsharks of this genus have a slim body and variegated colour pattern, narrow snout, long labial furrows, equal-size dorsal fins, and small anal fin (smaller than the dorsal fins).
