= Smallfin catshark =

Conservation status
- Least Concern (IUCN 3.1)

Scientific classification
- Kingdom: Animalia
- Phylum: Chordata
- Class: Chondrichthyes
- Subclass: Elasmobranchii
- Division: Selachii
- Order: Carcharhiniformes
- Family: Pentanchidae
- Genus: Apristurus
- Species: A. parvipinnis

Binomial name
- Apristurus parvipinnis S. Springer & Heemstra, 1979
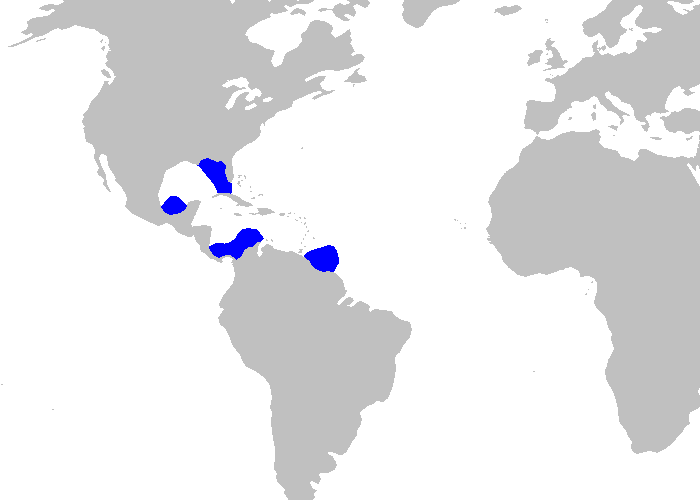

Species of shark

The smallfin catshark (Apristurus parvipinnis) is a species of shark belonging to the family Pentanchidae, the deepwater catsharks in the order Carcharhiniformes. This shark is found in the western Atlantic at depths between 35 and 1,115 m (115 and 3,658 ft). Its length is up to 48 cm (19 in).
