= Broadnose catshark =

Conservation status
- Least Concern (IUCN 3.1)

Scientific classification
- Kingdom: Animalia
- Phylum: Chordata
- Class: Chondrichthyes
- Subclass: Elasmobranchii
- Division: Selachii
- Order: Carcharhiniformes
- Family: Pentanchidae
- Genus: Apristurus
- Species: A. investigatoris

Binomial name
- Apristurus investigatoris (Misra, 1962)
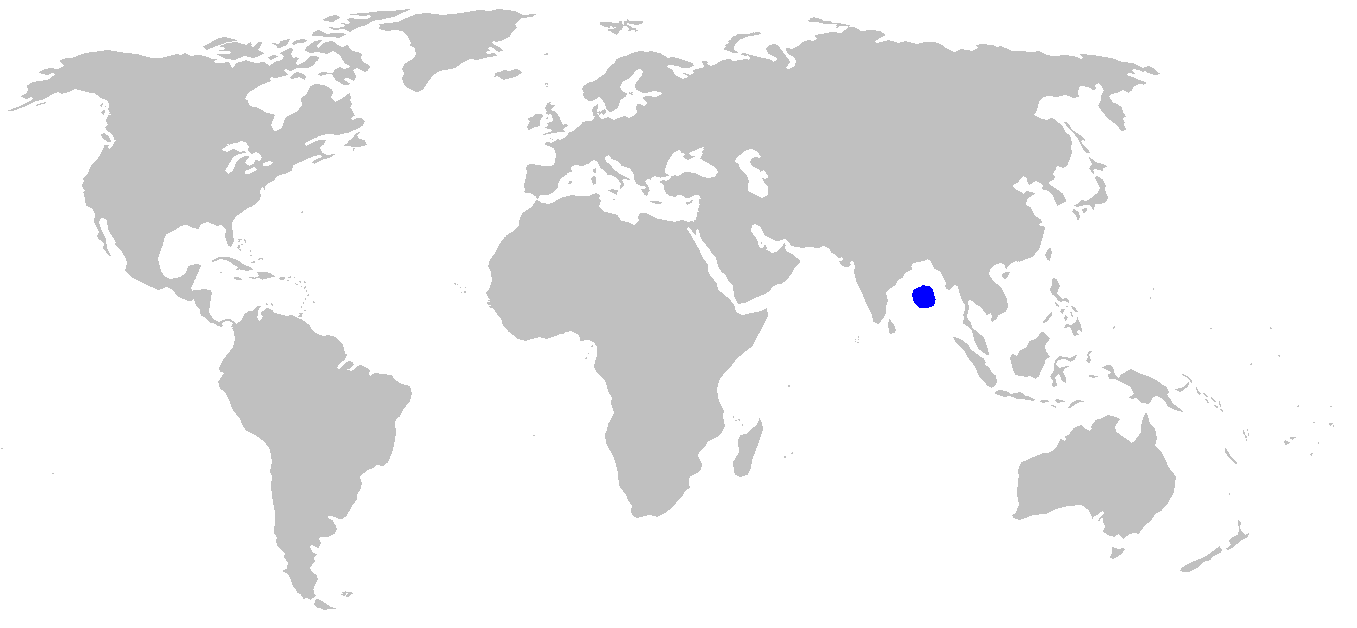

Species of shark

The broadnose catshark (Apristurus investigatoris) is a shark of the family Pentanchidae, the deepwater catsharks. The holotype and only specimen being found in deep water in the Andaman Sea in the Indian Ocean between 16 and 10°N. Its length is around 26 cm, although this measurement was taken from an immature specimen. The reproduction of this catshark is oviparous. The threats are not exactly known, but may include deepwater fisheries.
