= Variegated catshark =

Conservation status
- Least Concern (IUCN 3.1)

Scientific classification
- Kingdom: Animalia
- Phylum: Chordata
- Class: Chondrichthyes
- Subclass: Elasmobranchii
- Division: Selachii
- Order: Carcharhiniformes
- Family: Pentanchidae
- Genus: Asymbolus
- Species: A. submaculatus

Binomial name
- Asymbolus submaculatus Compagno, Stevens & Last, 1999
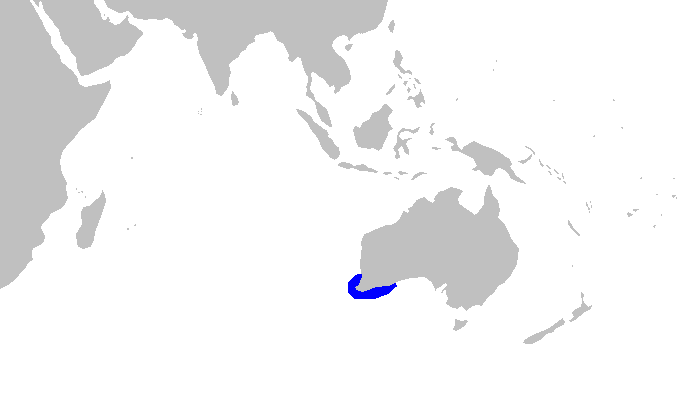

Species of shark

The variegated catshark (Asymbolus submaculatus) is a species of shark belonging to the family Pentanchidae, the deepwater catsharks. This shark is found off New South Wales and Western Australia at depths between 30 and 200 m. Its length is up to 41 cm. The reproduction of this catshark is oviparous.
