= White-bodied catshark =

Conservation status
- Least Concern (IUCN 3.1)

Scientific classification
- Kingdom: Animalia
- Phylum: Chordata
- Class: Chondrichthyes
- Subclass: Elasmobranchii
- Division: Selachii
- Order: Carcharhiniformes
- Family: Pentanchidae
- Genus: Apristurus
- Species: A. albisoma

Binomial name
- Apristurus albisoma Nakaya & Séret, 1999
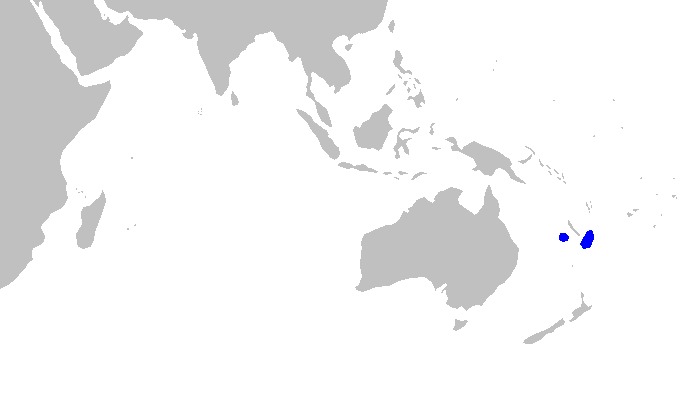

Species of shark

The white-bodied catshark (Apristurus albisoma) is a catshark of the family Pentanchidae, the deepwater catsharks.

== Description ==
This shark is coloured whitish to light grey.

== Distribution ==
This species is found in the western Pacific. The area of occupancy of this small benthic endemic shark was presumed very limited (less than 2,000 km²), being restricted to a narrow depth band on insular and seamount slopes near New Caledonia. However, this species has been collected in waters of the north of New Zealand on the West Norfolk Ridge.

== Conservation status ==
Although this species has been classified by the International Union for Conservation of Nature as of least concern, there is a worry that it may be taken as un-utilised bycatch by deepwater trawl fisheries and that, like other deepwater species, it may not be sufficiently fecund to withstand exploitation pressure by these fisheries. The New Zealand Department of Conservation has classified the white-bodied catshark as "Data deficient" under the New Zealand Threat Classification System.
