= Largenose catshark =

Conservation status
- Least Concern (IUCN 3.1)

Scientific classification
- Kingdom: Animalia
- Phylum: Chordata
- Class: Chondrichthyes
- Subclass: Elasmobranchii
- Division: Selachii
- Order: Carcharhiniformes
- Family: Pentanchidae
- Genus: Apristurus
- Species: A. nasutus

Binomial name
- Apristurus nasutus F. de Buen, 1959
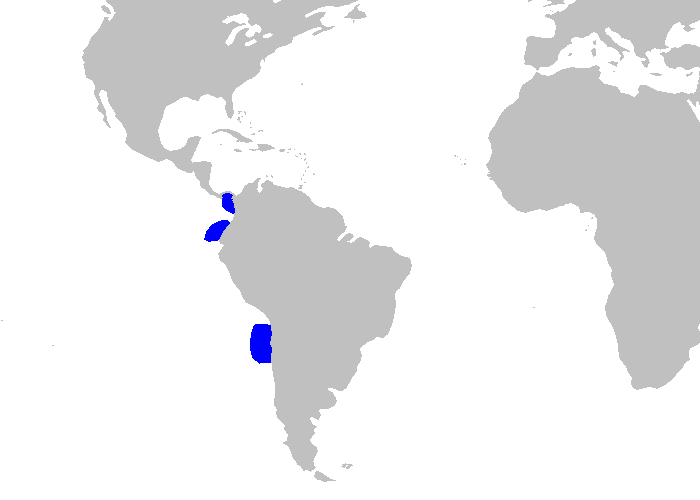

Species of shark

The largenose catshark (Apristurus nasutus) is a species of shark belonging to the family Pentanchidae, the deepwater catsharks. The largenose catshark is found on the upper continental slopes in the eastern Pacific, from the Gulf of Panama to Ecuador and central Chile, between 9°N and 28°S. It can grow up to 70 cm. Its reproduction is oviparous. This shark is considered to be a harmless species. It is known to originate from the Gulf of Panama, Ecuador, and Central Chile.

This shark has a reported length of between 50–70 cm. It lives mostly on the Eastern Pacific Ocean. Though the biology on this species is not much known, these sharks tend to stay together with the same individuals, traveling as a pack. This species is harmless to humans, and is oviparous.

Parasites of the largenose catshark, studied off Chile, include monogeneans, cestodes, and nematodes.
