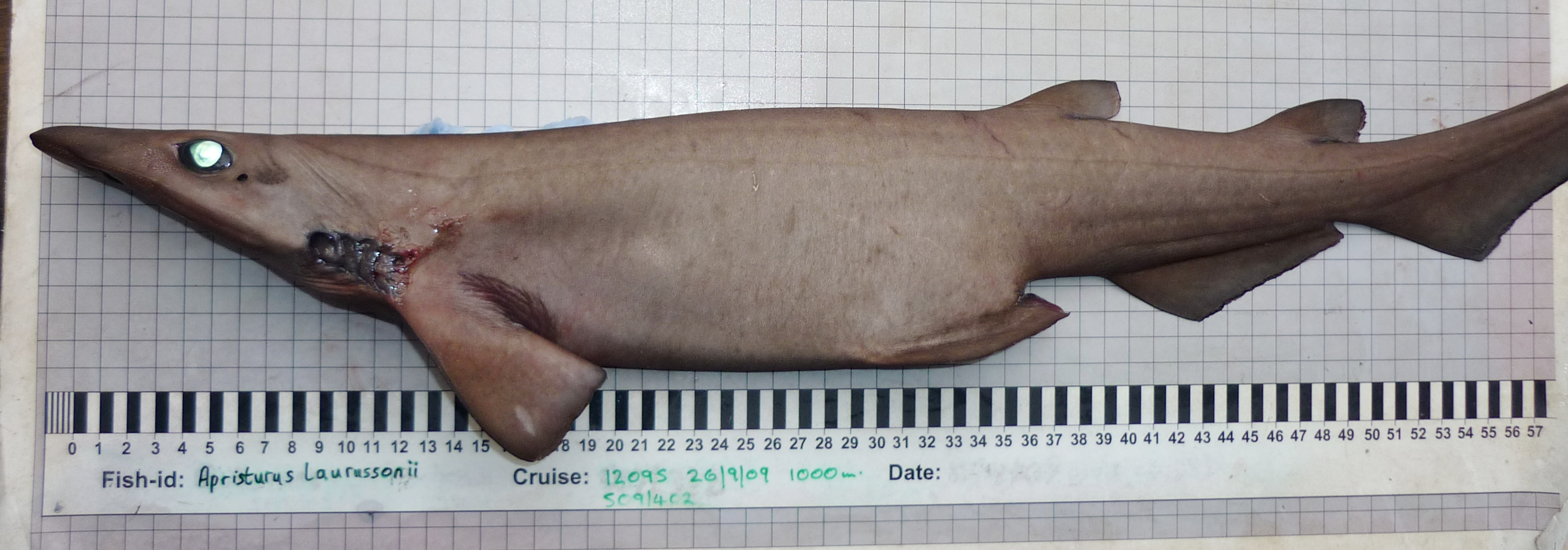

Conservation status
- Least Concern (IUCN 3.1)

Scientific classification
- Kingdom: Animalia
- Phylum: Chordata
- Class: Chondrichthyes
- Subclass: Elasmobranchii
- Division: Selachii
- Order: Carcharhiniformes
- Family: Pentanchidae
- Genus: Apristurus
- Species: A. laurussonii

Binomial name
- Apristurus laurussonii (Sæmundsson, 1922)
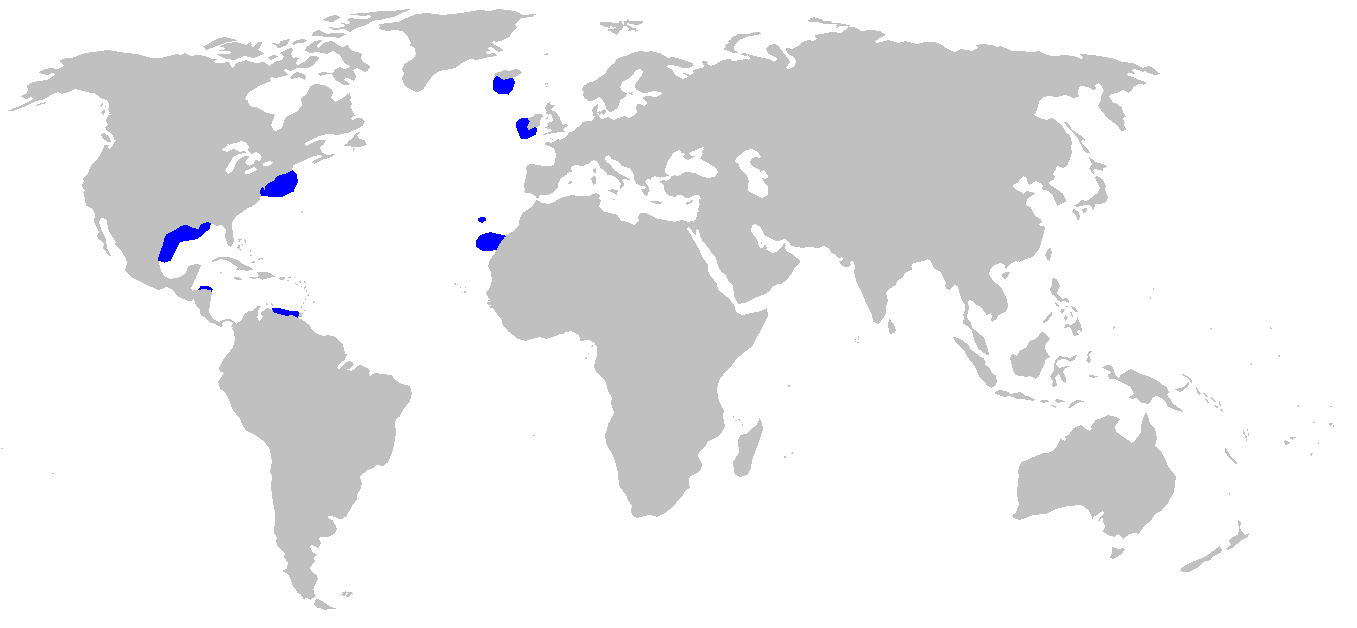
- Range of the Iceland catshark

Synonyms
- Apristurus maderensis Cadenat & Maul, 1966; Apristurus atlanticus Koefoed, 1927; Scylliorhinus atlanticus Koefoed, 1927; Scyllium laurussonii Sæmundsson, 1922

= Iceland catshark =

Species of shark

The Iceland or Icelandic catshark (Apristurus laurussonii) is a species of shark, belonging to the family Pentanchidae, the deepwater catsharks. This catshark is found in the western Atlantic, from Massachusetts, Delaware, and the northern Gulf of Mexico, as well as the eastern Atlantic from Iceland, southwestern Ireland, the Canary Islands, Madeira, South Africa, and between 67 and 11°N. They are found in depths of 550 to 1450 meters near or at the bottom over upper continental slopes.

== Etymology ==
The catshark was named by Sæmundsson, in honor of his friend Gísli Lárusson (1865–1935), a goldsmith, a watchmaker, farmer and nature enthusiast, for his support of the study of Icelandic fishes.

== Description ==
It has a relatively slender body, tapering slightly toward the head. It has a broad and somewhat long, bell-shaped snout. It has short gill slits, and adults have small eyes. The first and second dorsal fins are almost the same size. It is dark brown with no prominent markings. It reaches a maximum size of around 67 cm. The average size ranges from 50 cm to 60 cm. Its diet consists of squid, bony fish, marine worms (such as the lugworm or clam worm), and crustaceans, including lobster, shrimp, and crabs.
