= A. macrostomus =

A. macrostomus may refer to:

- Apristurus macrostomus, a catshark
- Apteronotus macrostomus, a species of knifefish in the genus Apteronotus
