= White ghost =

White ghost may refer to:

- Guinevere (also The White Fay/Ghost), the wife and queen of King Arthur in the Arthurian legend
- Ju-On: White Ghost, a 2009 Japanese supernatural horror film
- Ken Le Breton (also The White Ghost; 1924–1951), Australian Motorcycle speedway rider
- White ghost catshark, a shark of the family Scyliorhinidae found in deep water in the northeast Atlantic
- White Ghost, a 1988 action film about an M.I.A. US soldier who's been in hiding in the jungles of communist Vietnam.
