= Pale catshark =

Conservation status
- Least Concern (IUCN 3.1)

Scientific classification
- Kingdom: Animalia
- Phylum: Chordata
- Class: Chondrichthyes
- Subclass: Elasmobranchii
- Division: Selachii
- Order: Carcharhiniformes
- Family: Pentanchidae
- Genus: Apristurus
- Species: A. sibogae

Binomial name
- Apristurus sibogae (M. C. W. Weber, 1913)
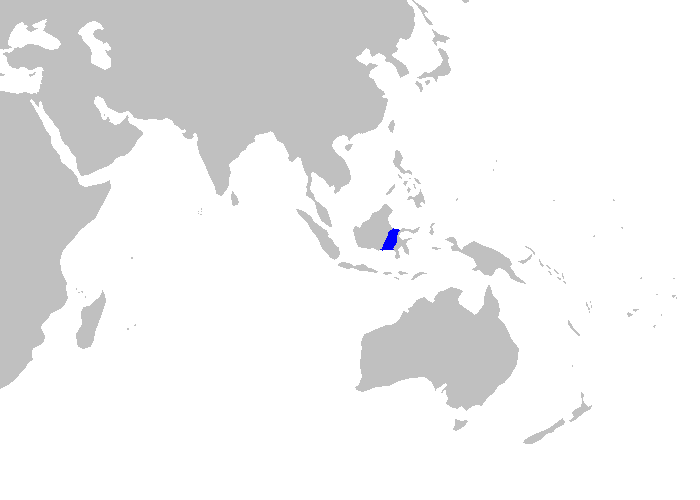

Species of shark

The pale catshark (Apristurus sibogae) is a rare species of shark belonging to the family Pentanchidae, the deepwater catsharks. The holotype, the only specimen, was found on the Makassar Strait slope at a depth of 655 m (2,149 ft). Its length is around 21 cm (8.3 in), although this measurement was taken from a juvenile specimen. The reproduction of the pale catshark is oviparous.
