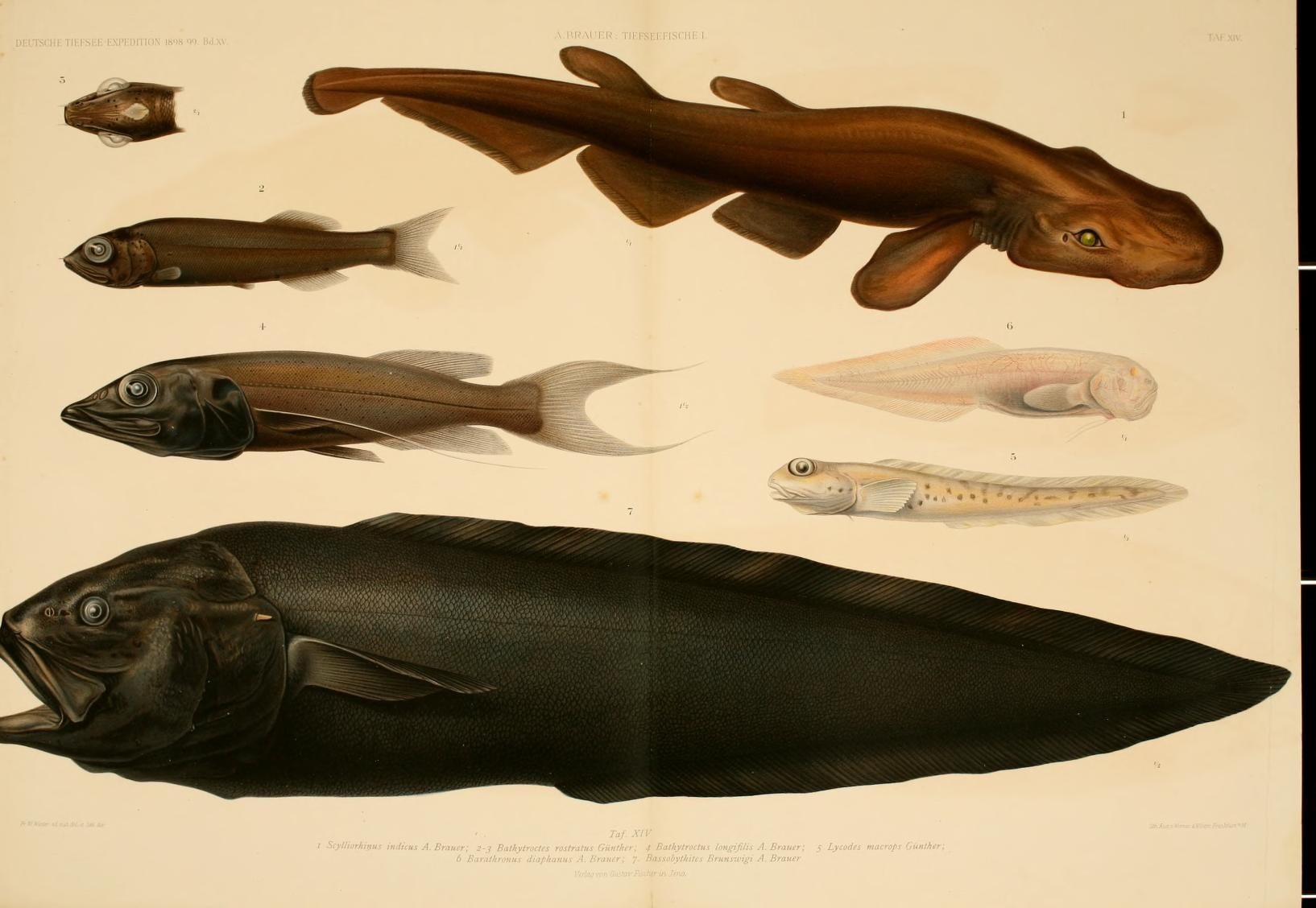

Conservation status
- Least Concern (IUCN 3.1)

Scientific classification
- Kingdom: Animalia
- Phylum: Chordata
- Class: Chondrichthyes
- Subclass: Elasmobranchii
- Division: Selachii
- Order: Carcharhiniformes
- Family: Pentanchidae
- Genus: Apristurus
- Species: A. indicus

Binomial name
- Apristurus indicus (A. B. Brauer, 1906)
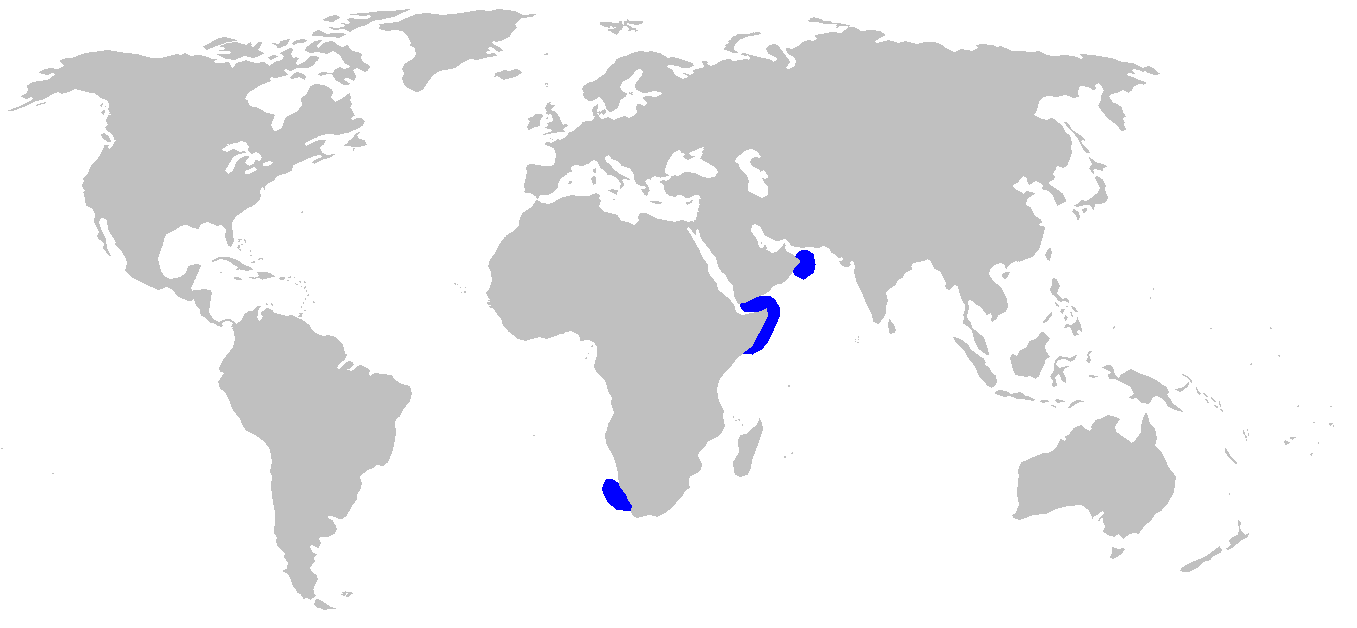

= Smallbelly catshark =

Species of shark

The smallbelly catshark (Apristurus indicus) is a shark of the family Pentanchidae, the deepwater catsharks. This species is found in the western Indian Ocean near Somalia, the Gulf of Aden, and Oman, at depths between 1,300 and 1,840 m. Its length is up to 34 cm, although this measurement is of an immature specimen. The smallbelly catshark is not well known. It is found on continental slopes, and is probably caught by bottom trawlers. The reproduction of the smallbelly catshark is oviparous.
