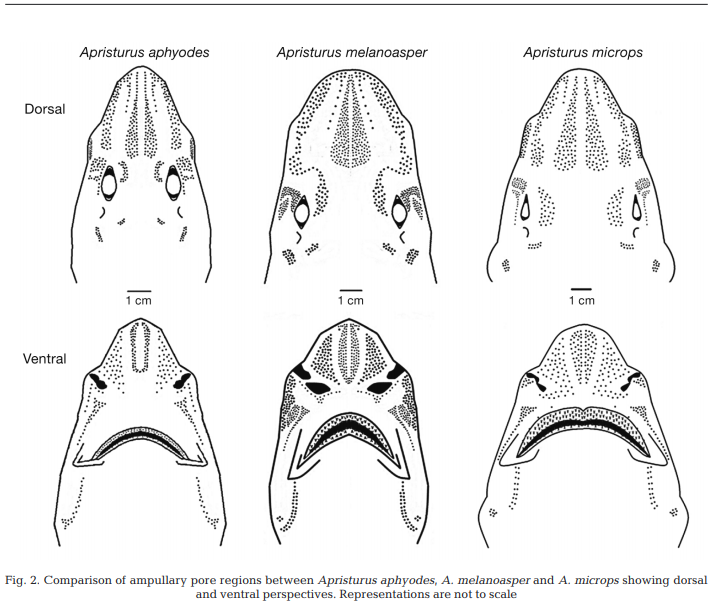

Conservation status
- Least Concern (IUCN 3.1)

Scientific classification
- Kingdom: Animalia
- Phylum: Chordata
- Class: Chondrichthyes
- Subclass: Elasmobranchii
- Division: Selachii
- Order: Carcharhiniformes
- Family: Pentanchidae
- Genus: Apristurus
- Species: A. microps

Binomial name
- Apristurus microps (Gilchrist, 1922)
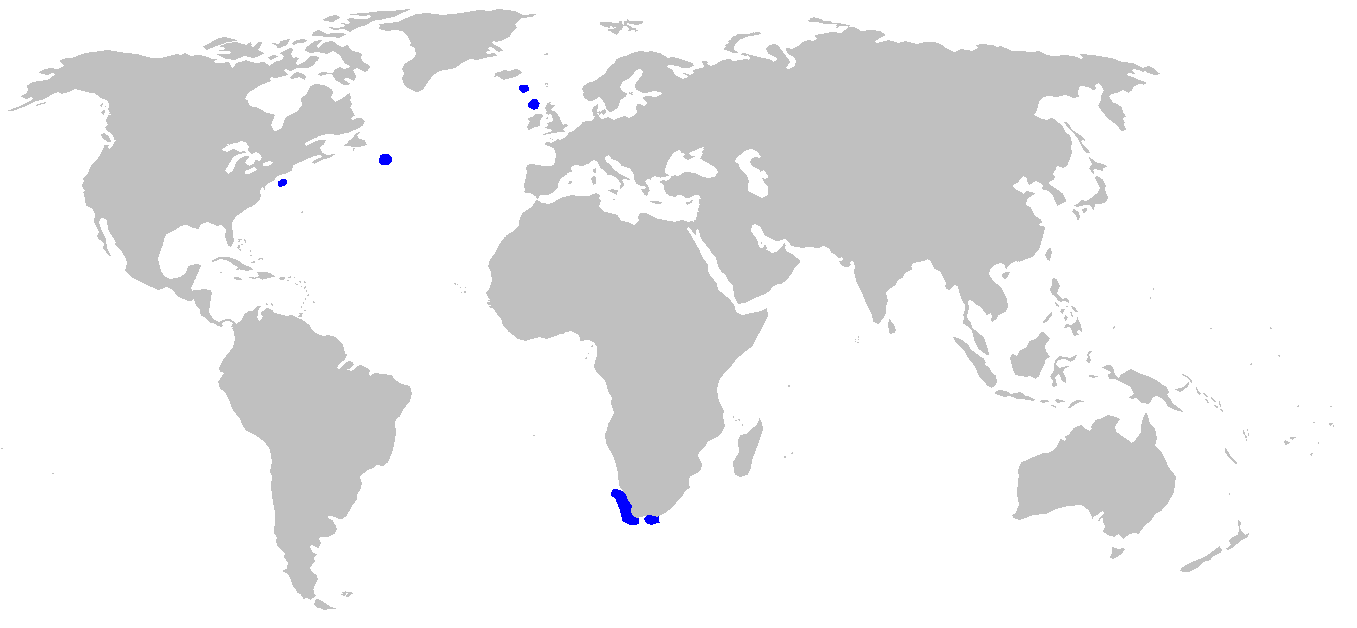

= Smalleye catshark =

Species of shark

The smalleye catshark (Apristurus microps) is a species of shark belonging to the family Pentanchidae, the deepwater catsharks. This shark is found in the southeast Atlantic at depths between 700 and 2,000 m. It can grow up to 61 cm. The reproduction of this catshark is oviparous.
