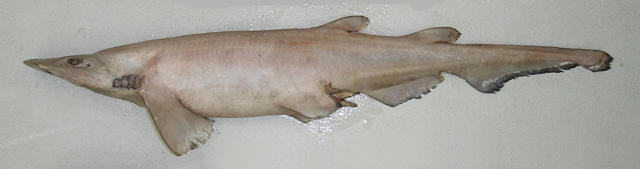

Conservation status
- Least Concern (IUCN 3.1)

Scientific classification
- Kingdom: Animalia
- Phylum: Chordata
- Class: Chondrichthyes
- Subclass: Elasmobranchii
- Division: Selachii
- Order: Carcharhiniformes
- Family: Pentanchidae
- Genus: Apristurus
- Species: A. exsanguis

Binomial name
- Apristurus exsanguis Sato, Nakaya & A. L. Stewart, 1999
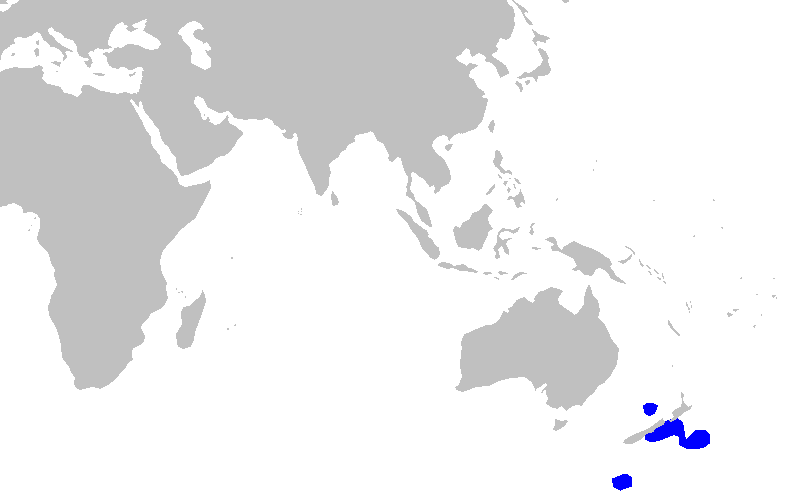

= Flaccid catshark =

Species of shark

The flaccid catshark (Apristurus exsanguis) is a shark of the family Pentanchidae. It is endemic to the waters around New Zealand.

== Distribution ==
This species is found only around New Zealand, although its collection records indicate it is widespread and probably continuously distributed over the mid- to lower slope around New Zealand. The biology of all Apristurus species within the New Zealand Exclusive Economic Zone is very poorly known, due to the uncertain taxonomy of the group. They appear to be most abundant below 1,000 m, and are the only sharks regularly taken in research trawls below 1,200 m on the Chatham Rise. As relatively little fishing occurs below 1,200 m, a large part of their population may be effectively beyond fishing depths.

== Conservation status ==
The New Zealand Department of Conservation has classified the flaccid catshark as "Data deficient" under the New Zealand Threat Classification System.
