= Longnose sawtail catshark =

Conservation status
- Least Concern (IUCN 3.1)

Scientific classification
- Kingdom: Animalia
- Phylum: Chordata
- Class: Chondrichthyes
- Subclass: Elasmobranchii
- Division: Selachii
- Order: Carcharhiniformes
- Family: Pentanchidae
- Genus: Galeus
- Species: G. longirostris

Binomial name
- Galeus longirostris Tachikawa & Taniuchi, 1987
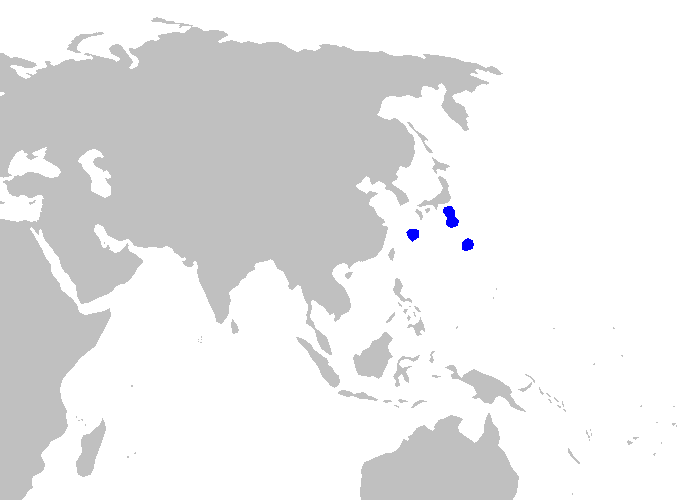
- Range of the longnose sawtail catshark

Species of shark

The longnose sawtail catshark (Galeus longirostris) is a little-known species of deepwater catshark, belonging to the family Pentanchidae, found off the northwestern Pacific islands of Amami Ōshima, Ogasawara, and Izu at depths of 350–550 m (1,150–1,800 ft). Reaching a length of 80 cm (31 in), it is characterized by a long flattened snout, a long space between the pelvic and anal fins, and a crest of enlarged dermal denticles along the dorsal caudal fin edge. Adults are plain dark gray above, while juveniles have a few faint dark saddles on the back and tail.

== Taxonomy ==
The first known specimen of the longnose sawtail catshark was hooked on a bottom longline off the Ogasawara Islands in 1983. The new species was described by Hiroyuki Tachikawa and Toru Taniuchi in a 1987 issue of the Japanese Journal of Ichthyology, and given the specific epithet longirostris from the Latin longus ("long"), and rostrum ("snout"). A 68 cm (27 in) long female caught off Amami Ōshima was designated as the type specimen. Within the genus, this species most closely resembles the broadfin sawtail catshark (G. nipponensis).

== Distribution and habitat ==
The longnose sawtail catshark has been recorded from south of Japan, off the islands of Amami Ōshima, Ogasawara, and Izu. This demersal species inhabits upper insular slopes at a depth of 350–550 m (1,150–1,800 ft), and is reportedly rather common.

== Description ==
One of the larger members of the genus, the longnose sawtail catshark grows to at least 80 cm (31 in) long. This species has a rather stout body and a flattened head. The snout is notably long, with a rounded tip. The nostrils are large and divided by triangular skin flaps on their anterior rims. The large, horizontally oval eyes are equipped with rudimentary nictitating membranes (protective third eyelids) and have thin ridges underneath. There is a medium-sized spiracle behind each eye. The mouth forms a wide arch and bears well-developed furrows around the corners. The tooth rows number 60–70 in either jaw; each tooth is small, with a narrow central cusp and 3–6 smaller lateral cusplets. The five pairs of gill slits are short, with the fifth pair over the pectoral fin bases.

The origins of the first and second dorsal fins lie over the latter half of the pelvic fins and the midpoint of the anal fin respectively. The dorsal fins are roughly triangular with blunt apexes, with the first slightly larger than the second. The large, wide pectoral fins have rounded corners. The pelvic fins are of moderate size; the claspers of mature males are extremely long, reaching past the origin of the anal fin, and have patches of hooks on the underside. The base of the anal fin measures around 11–13% of the total length, about equal to the distance between it and the pelvic fins. The caudal peduncle is compressed from side to side, and leads to a low caudal fin with a small lower lobe and a ventral notch near the tip of the upper lobe. The dermal denticles are small and overlapping, each bearing a median ridge and three marginal teeth. A saw-like crest of enlarged denticles is present along the anterior portion of the dorsal caudal fin edge. Adults are a plain dark gray above and off-white below. The trailing margins of the dorsal and pectoral fins are edged in white, and the pelvic and anal fins are dusky. The inside of the mouth is light gray. Juveniles have faint darker saddles below each dorsal fin, and a few more on the caudal fin. Sharks from Amami Ōshima have faint grayish spots under the pectoral fins.

== Biology and ecology ==
Virtually nothing is known of the natural history of the longnose sawtail catshark. Males and females mature sexually at around 66–71 cm (26–28 in) and 68–78 cm (27–31 in) long respectively.

== Human interactions ==
While specific data is lacking, the longnose sawtail catshark is likely taken as bycatch in deepwater trawl fisheries. The International Union for Conservation of Nature (IUCN) has listed it as Least Concern.
