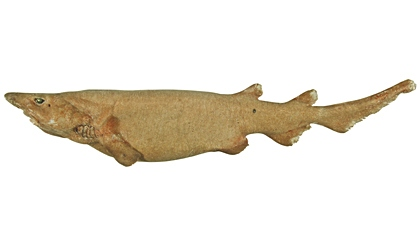

Conservation status
- Data Deficient (IUCN 3.1)

Scientific classification
- Kingdom: Animalia
- Phylum: Chordata
- Class: Chondrichthyes
- Subclass: Elasmobranchii
- Division: Selachii
- Order: Carcharhiniformes
- Family: Pentanchidae
- Genus: Apristurus
- Species: A. bucephalus

Binomial name
- Apristurus bucephalus W. T. White, Last & Pogonoski, 2008
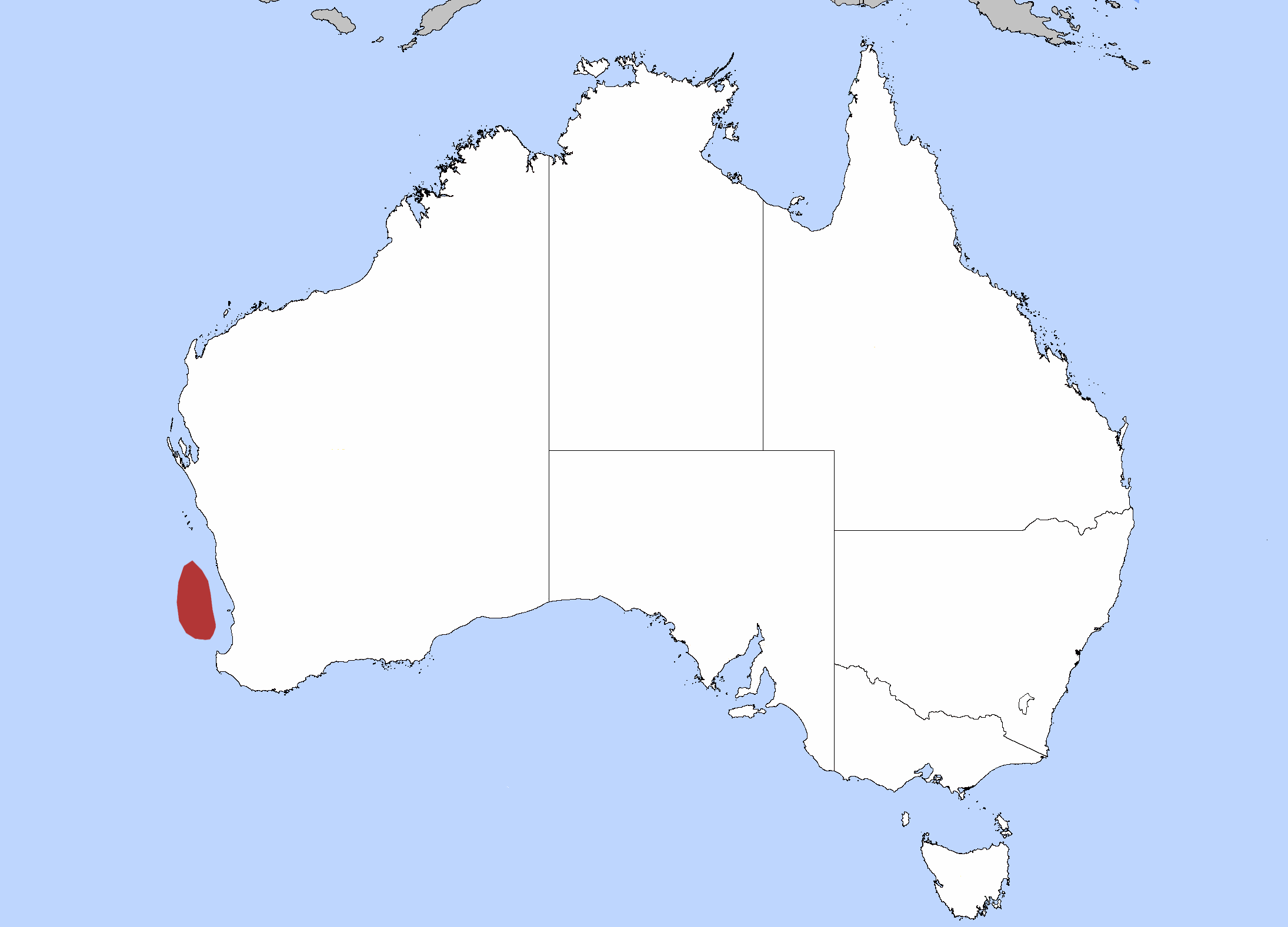
- Distribution of the bighead catshark

= Bighead catshark =

Species of fish

The bighead catshark (Apristurus bucephalus) is a species of fish in the family Pentanchidae, the deepwater catsharks. This species is endemic to Australia. Its natural habitat is the open seas. It belongs to a genus of poorly known deep-water catsharks, and is recorded from only three specimens taken off Perth, Western Australia. This species could be rare or uncommon, and the effects of fisheries are unknown, though if its biology is like other deep-water shark species, it may not be sufficiently fecund to withstand exploitation pressures.
