= Hoary catshark =

Conservation status
- Least Concern (IUCN 3.1)

Scientific classification
- Kingdom: Animalia
- Phylum: Chordata
- Class: Chondrichthyes
- Subclass: Elasmobranchii
- Division: Selachii
- Order: Carcharhiniformes
- Family: Pentanchidae
- Genus: Apristurus
- Species: A. canutus

Binomial name
- Apristurus canutus S. Springer & Heemstra, 1979
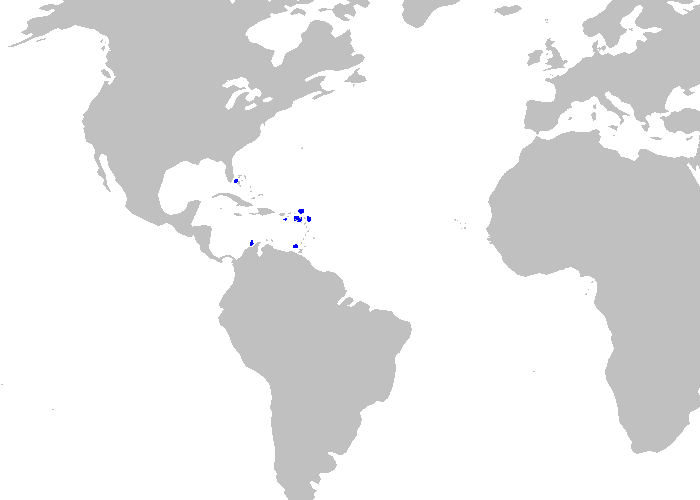

Species of shark

The hoary catshark (Apristurus canutus) is a shark of the family Pentanchidae, also called the deepwater catsharks. This species is found in the western central Atlantic in the Caribbean, at depths between 521 and 915 m (1,709 and 3,002 ft). Its length is up to 45.5 cm (17.9 in). The hoary catshark is oviparous; it reproduces by laying eggs.
