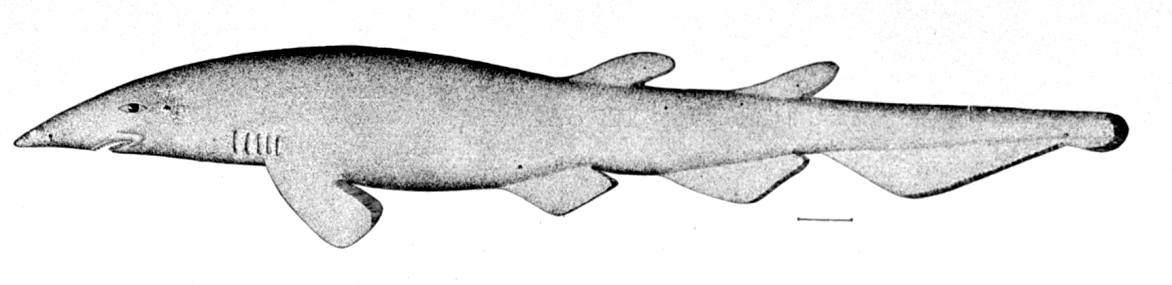

Conservation status
- Least Concern (IUCN 3.1)

Scientific classification
- Kingdom: Animalia
- Phylum: Chordata
- Class: Chondrichthyes
- Subclass: Elasmobranchii
- Division: Selachii
- Order: Carcharhiniformes
- Family: Pentanchidae
- Genus: Apristurus
- Species: A. profundorum

Binomial name
- Apristurus profundorum (Goode & T. H. Bean, 1896)

= Deepwater catshark =

Species of shark

The deepwater catshark (Apristurus profundorum) is a species of shark belonging to the family Pentanchidae, the deepwater catsharks. This shark is found in the western Atlantic from Delaware Bay to Suriname, and in the eastern Atlantic from Morocco to northwest Africa. An important key factor to understanding these creatures is ageing, many deepwater Apristurus profundorum have poorly calcified vertebrae that lack visible growth bands, and most do not have dorsal fin spines that can be used for ageing. Other methods, such as captive growth and tag-recapture, are also limited in their suitability for deepwater chondrichthyans due to difficulties in the deep sea.
