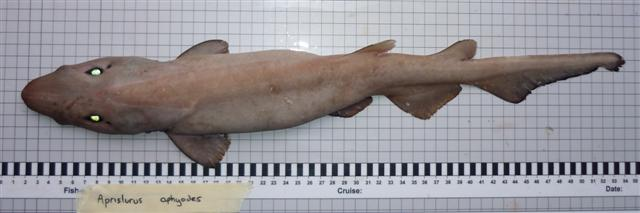

Conservation status
- Least Concern (IUCN 3.1)

Scientific classification
- Kingdom: Animalia
- Phylum: Chordata
- Class: Chondrichthyes
- Subclass: Elasmobranchii
- Division: Selachii
- Order: Carcharhiniformes
- Family: Pentanchidae
- Genus: Apristurus
- Species: A. aphyodes

Binomial name
- Apristurus aphyodes Nakaya & Stehmann, 1998
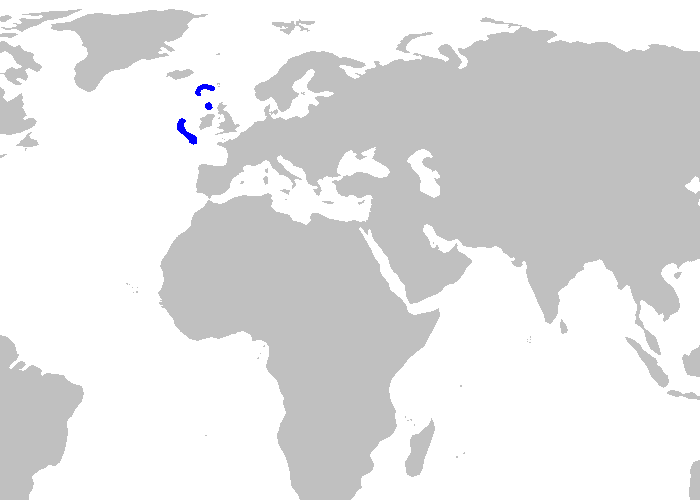
- Distribution (in blue; click to enlarge)

= White ghost catshark =

Species of shark

The white ghost catshark (Apristurus aphyodes) is a shark of the catshark family Pentanchidae, the deepwater catsharks. This shark is found in deep water in the northeast Atlantic between latitudes 57°N and 58°N. A deep-water catshark known from the eastern North Atlantic from depths of 1,014 to 1,800 m, it is known from only a limited number of specimens. It reaches a maximum of 54 cm or 1.7 ft total length which is a medium size for the Apristurus genus.

== Description and morphology ==
The white ghost catshark has a slender and cylindrical body with a relatively long and flattened snout. It is distinguished from the other 10 North Atlantic Apristurus species by the following. It has a uniform whitish coloration and large oval eyes with a weak subocular fold. Its snout is bell shaped and contains numerous visible pores making up ampullae of Lorenzini on the dorsal and ventral side of the snout. Its preorbital snout length (where the snout intersects its eyes) equals half of its head length. Aphyodes has elliptical ampullae patterns on the ventral midline of the snout and a slender elliptical patch on the dorsal side. Aphyodes has a strongly arched mouth with well developed labial furrows (grooves around the lips) with its upper labial furrows shorter than its lower labial furrows. Aphyodes's spiracle is small and located slightly below the horizontal axis of its eyes. It has five small gill openings the smallest of which is located above its pectoral fin. Aphyodes has widely spaced pectoral and pelvic fins with their interspace about equal to the length of its head. Its pectoral fins are small, narrow and sub quadrangular(almost quadrilateral). In contrast their pelvic fins are more normal in proportion to their body size. The catshark's dorsal fins are unequal in size and unlike most sharks its first dorsal fin is smaller than its second dorsal fin. Its first dorsal fin starts above the anterior half of the pelvic base and ends in the interspace between its pelvic and anal fins. The second dorsal fin's origin is above the middle of the anal base and ends slightly before the anal fins. Aphyodes's anal and caudal fins are only separated by a distinct subterminal notch on the caudal fin. The caudal fin itself is slender and short and its lower anterior corner is slightly expanded. Its claspers are short but robust and portions are covered in dermal denticles. The reproductive organ lacks clasper hooks or claws. Dermal denticles on aphyodes's dorsal and lateral sides are concave and tricuspid (3 pointed) with the middle point being longer than the other 2.

== Habitat ==
North Eastern Atlantic deep water off the coast of the UK is dominated by deep ocean basins. The average ocean depth is 5,800 m (19,000 ft). Sediments are composed of clay particles and calcareous from phytoplankton. Near the continental shelf the sediment is primarily made of sand and mud scales. Deep water temperatures are 5.5–7.5 °C. Habitat characteristics are shaped by North Atlantic Deep Water and its resulting thermohaline circulation. Primary productivity in this part of the ocean is low and the area is considered oligotrophic or less than 100 g carbon per m^{2} per year, though it experiences short phytoplankton blooms of diatoms in the spring and fall due to the thermocline being weak in those times and strong upwelling and picoplankton blooms in the summer as the thermocline strengthens. Deep water corals consisting of Lophelia pertusa are the main reef building species present. They contain the area's highest biodiversity including species such as bryozoans, hydroids, sponges, redfish, saithe, cod, squat lobsters, squid, mollusks, starfish and sea urchins. Biodiversity in the area is also concentrate around hydrothermal vents. Three vent systems have been found in North Eastern Atlantic deep water named Lucy Strike, Menez Gwen and Rainbow.

== Hunting patterns ==
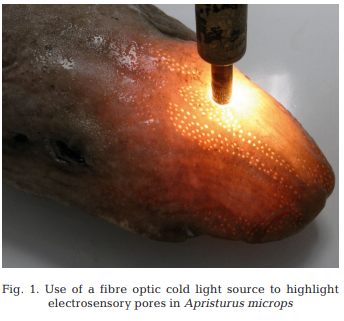
Use of a fiber optic cold light source to highlight electrosensory pores in Apristurus microps. Though the image is of Apristurus microps this technique was also used on aphyodes.

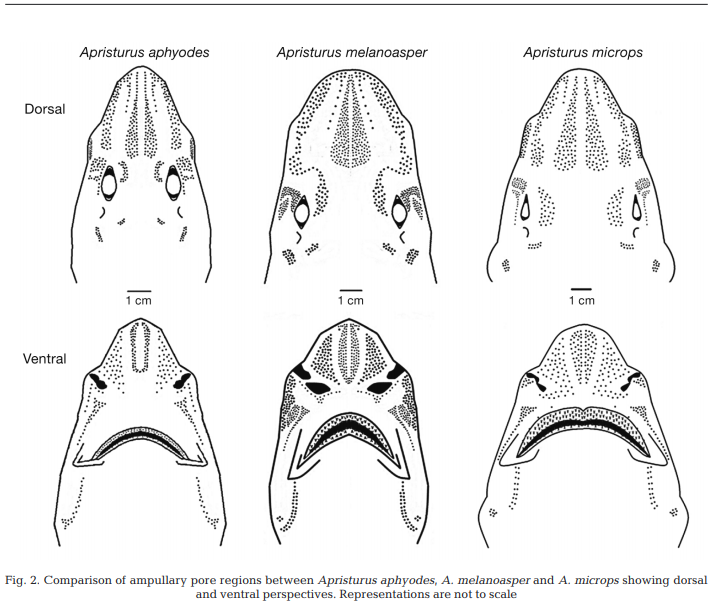
Comparison of ampullae distribution and concentration among Apristurus species

Apristurus aphyodes preys upon crustaceans, cephalopods and small teleost (ray-finned) fish at depths of 1014 to 1080 m.

Information about deepwater catsharks is very rare due to the lack of specimens. Research was conducted using individuals found in a deep water trawl survey of the Rockall Trough off Scotland in 2014. Heads of the individuals from the study were analyzed for their ampullae of lorenzini concentrations and distribution and it was concluded that the species is a vertical ambush predator that attacks from below due to the highest concentration of the electroreception pores being located on the dorsal portion of the snouts of full grown adults instead of the ventral portion, a trait shared by other vertical ambush sharks which attack from below. Some features of the shark head, such as a subterminal mouth, counter the idea of the catshark ambushing prey from below. The density of dorsal electroception could be explained instead by avoidance of predators from above. Researchers concluded that the species shifts its diet and hunting patterns from ambushing prey from above to ambushing prey from below as it grows because the number of ampullae pores remains constant throughout an individual's life giving it a high concentration of pores when it is smaller and a lower concentration when it is larger. As the ampullae pores move away from each other with the growth of the face, density decreases with age. High ampullae density make sensing immobile prey more clear whereas low ampullae concentrations are better at sensing mobile prey. As the shark grows it feeds more on squid and fish than crustaceans. This conclusion was supported by another study, which showed a switch in diet from crustaceans to teleost fish and squid.

== Reproduction and maturity ==
Similar to its hunting behavior, very little is known about aphyodes's reproduction (other than that it is oviparous and lays paired eggs) and aging, partially because their biology is resistant to traditional aging techniques due to having low calcium in their vertebra in addition to those vertebra being resistant to staining and cleaning agents. Aphyodes reaches sexual maturity between 47 and 50 cm and shows sexual dimorphism with females being larger than males.

== Conservation status ==
The North-east Atlantic is divided into 3 major areas by the OSPAR convention. These areas are the Celtic sea, the Bay of Biscay and the Iberian coast and the open ocean areas. The Celtic sea, which contains aphyodes habitat like the Rockall Trough in Scotlant, is densely populated with fishery catchment areas for species like Anchovy and Blue whiting in addition to containing industrial activity and marine tourism. The Rockall Trough is under increasing deep sea fishing pressure in recent years and there is worry among scientists that aphyodes and several other Apristurus species are under threat there as it's regularly caught as bycatch especially by deep sea trawling. Overfishing in the Bay of Biscay has already led to a local extinction of elasmobranchs. According to the IUCN redlist there is not enough information to determine its conservation status however.

The largest threats to biodiversity in the region are a lack of sustainable fishing regulation including bottom trawling and pollution from maritime transport such as oil spills and antifouling paint and chemical pollution such as antibiotics and pesticides from maricultural activities. This problem is compounded by a lack of deepwater monitoring programs in the North Eastern Atlantic because it is difficult to enforce regulation without population data. The North East Atlantic Ocean has some strong protections such as the OSPAR (1992 Convention for the Protection of the Marine Environment of the Northeast Atlantic) convention but protections from OSPAR are mostly coastal and don't protect aphyodes in any other parts of the ocean.

The European Union has banned fishing for deepwater sharks as concerns over bycatch and bottom trawling continue and both total allowable catch and bycatch are set at 0 in its regulations.
