= Broadmouth catshark =

Conservation status
- Least Concern (IUCN 3.1)

Scientific classification
- Kingdom: Animalia
- Phylum: Chordata
- Class: Chondrichthyes
- Subclass: Elasmobranchii
- Division: Selachii
- Order: Carcharhiniformes
- Family: Pentanchidae
- Genus: Apristurus
- Species: A. macrostomus

Binomial name
- Apristurus macrostomus Q. W. Meng, Y. T. Chu & S. Li, 1985
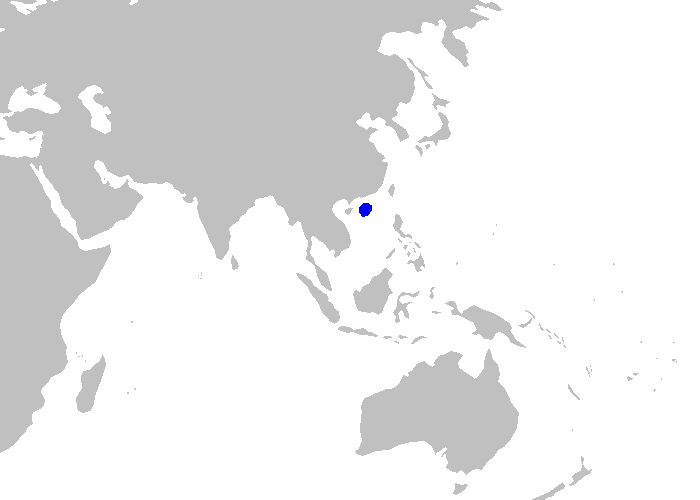

Species of shark

The broadmouth catshark (Apristurus macrostomus) is a rare species of shark of the family Pentanchidae, the deepwater catsharks. The holotype and only specimen was taken from off Zhujiang in the South China Sea, at a depth of 913 m. Its length is around 38 cm. The broadmouth catshark's reproduction is oviparous. Considering the species is not well known, its threats are not known, but may include deepwater fisheries.
