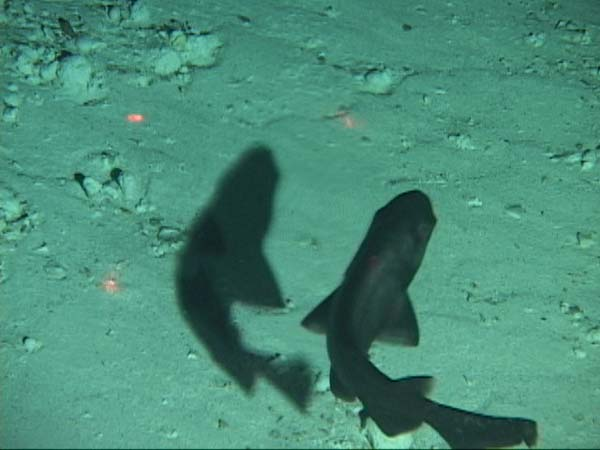

Conservation status
- Data Deficient (IUCN 3.1)

Scientific classification
- Kingdom: Animalia
- Phylum: Chordata
- Class: Chondrichthyes
- Subclass: Elasmobranchii
- Division: Selachii
- Order: Carcharhiniformes
- Family: Pentanchidae
- Genus: Apristurus
- Species: A. spongiceps

Binomial name
- Apristurus spongiceps (C. H. Gilbert, 1905)
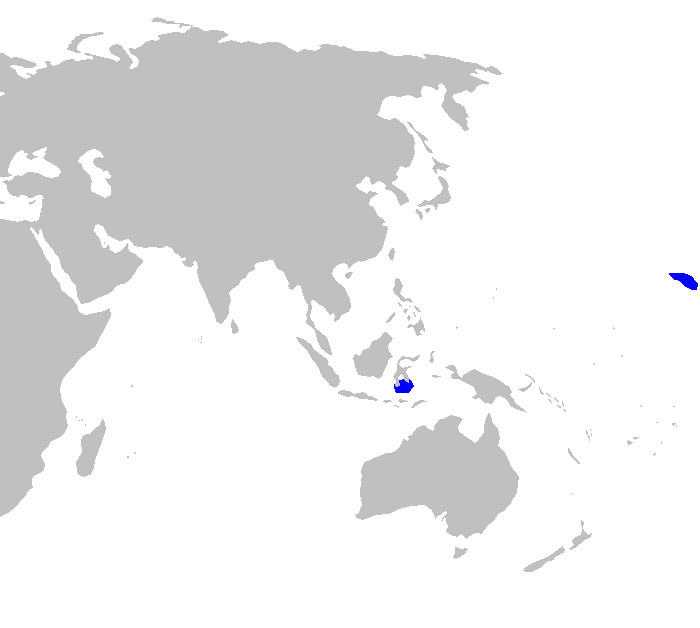
- Range of the spongehead catshark

Synonyms
- Catulus spongiceps Gilbert, 1905

= Spongehead catshark =

Species of shark

The spongehead catshark (Apristurus spongiceps) is a rare species of shark belonging to the family Pentanchidae, the deepwater catsharks. This species was only known from two specimens taken in the Pacific Ocean: an adult from near Bird Island, Hawaii, and a juvenile from the Banda Sea off Sulawesi. They are found on or near the bottoms of insular continental slopes, at depths of 570 to 1,480 m (1,870 to 4,860 ft). In 2002, the spongehead catshark was seen alive in its natural habitat for the first time, from the submersible Pisces IV at a depth of about a kilometer, on the Northampton Seamount off the northwestern Hawaiian Islands.

The spongehead catshark has a thick body and head, with a moderately long, broadly rounded snout. The five pairs of gill slits are very small, and the septa between them are covered with unique pleats and folds that extend above and below, over the throat. The eyes are small and the nostrils are broad, with slit-like incurrent and excurrent openings. The mouth is long, large, and broadly arched, bearing prominently expanded dental bands. The two dorsal fins are about equal in size; the pectoral fins are rather small, while the pelvic fins are high and broadly rounded. The anal fin is short, high, and rounded. The caudal fin is moderately broad. The dermal denticles are closely set and give the skin a fuzzy or felt-like texture. It is dark brown, without fin markings.

The adult holotype measured 51.4 cm (20.2 in) long and the juvenile measured 10.5 cm long. The juvenile was more slender than the adult, but shared the same distinctive pleated gills. As the holotype was a gravid female, the spongehead catshark is likely oviparous. The spongehead catshark belongs to the A. spongiceps species group, characterized by a short, wide snout, seven to 12 valves in the spiral intestine, the upper labial furrows subequal to or shorter than the lower furrows, and a continuous supraorbital sensory canal.
