= Longfin catshark =

Conservation status
- Least Concern (IUCN 3.1)

Scientific classification
- Kingdom: Animalia
- Phylum: Chordata
- Class: Chondrichthyes
- Subclass: Elasmobranchii
- Division: Selachii
- Order: Carcharhiniformes
- Family: Pentanchidae
- Genus: Apristurus
- Species: A. herklotsi

Binomial name
- Apristurus herklotsi (Fowler, 1934)
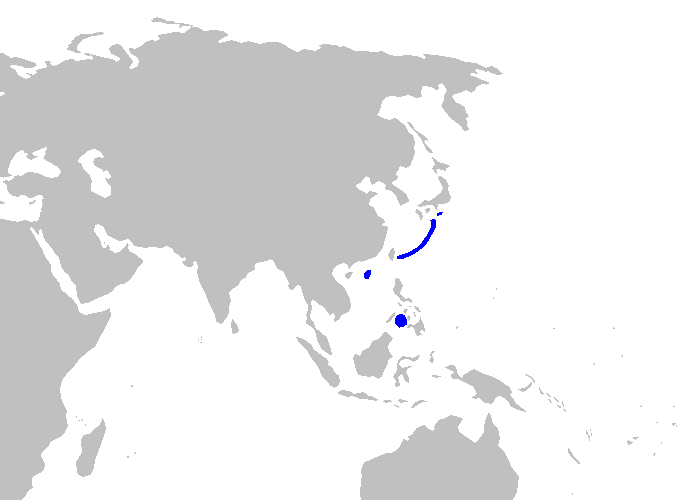

Species of shark

The longfin catshark (Apristurus herklotsi) is a shark of the family Pentanchidae. This shark is found in the western Pacific from Japan to the Philippines, and the East and South China Seas, and the Kyūshū-Palau Ridge, at depths between 530 and 865 m. Its length is up to 48 cm.

== Etymology ==
The catshark is named in honor of botanist and ornithologist G. A. C. Herklots (1902–1986) of the University of Hong Kong.
