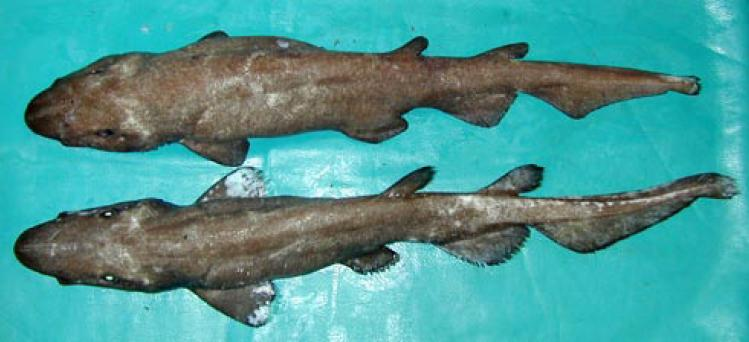
- Above: Deepwater catshark (A. profundorum); Below: Ghost catshark (A. manis)

Scientific classification
- Kingdom: Animalia
- Phylum: Chordata
- Class: Chondrichthyes
- Subclass: Elasmobranchii
- Division: Selachii
- Order: Carcharhiniformes
- Family: Pentanchidae
- Genus: Apristurus; Garman, 1913

Type species
- Scylliorhinus indicus Brauer, 1906

Synonyms
- Parapristurus Fowler, 1934

= Apristurus =

Genus of sharks

Apristurus is a genus of catsharks, the family Pentanchidae, the deepwater catsharks. The species in this genus are commonly known as the ghost or demon catsharks.

== Species ==
The 43 currently recognized living species in this genus are:

- Apristurus albisoma Nakaya & Séret, 1999 (white-bodied catshark)
- Apristurus ampliceps Sasahara, Sato & Nakaya, 2008 (roughskin catshark)
- Apristurus aphyodes Nakaya & Stehmann, 1998 (white ghost catshark)
- Apristurus australis Sato, Nakaya & Yorozu, 2008 (Pinocchio catshark)
- Apristurus breviventralis Kawauchi, Weigmann & Nakaya, 2014 (shortbelly catshark)
- Apristurus brunneus C. H. Gilbert, 1892 (brown catshark)
- Apristurus bucephalus W. T. White, Last & Pogonoski, 2008 (bighead catshark)
- Apristurus canutus S. Springer & Heemstra, 1979 (hoary catshark)
- Apristurus drona Beura, Bineesh & Banerjee, 2026 (Arabian slender catshark)
- Apristurus exsanguis Sato, Nakaya & A. L. Stewart, 1999 (flaccid catshark)
- Apristurus fedorovi Dolganov, 1985 (Fedorov's catshark)
- Apristurus garricki Sato, A.L. Stewart & Nakaya, 2013 (Garrick's catshark)
- Apristurus gibbosus Y. T. Chu, Q. W. Meng & S. Li, 1985 (humpback catshark)
- Apristurus herklotsi Fowler, 1934 (longfin catshark)
- Apristurus indicus A. B. Brauer, 1906 (smallbelly catshark)
- Apristurus internatus S. M. Deng, G. Q. Xiong & H. X. Zhan, 1988 (shortnose demon catshark)
- Apristurus investigatoris Misra, 1962 (broadnose catshark)
- Apristurus iterum White, O’Neill & Jayasinghe, 2025 (Copy catshark)
- Apristurus japonicus Nakaya, 1975 (Japanese catshark)
- Apristurus kampae L. R. Taylor, 1972 (longnose catshark)
- Apristurus laurussonii Sæmundsson, 1922 (Iceland catshark)
- Apristurus longicephalus Nakaya, 1975 (longhead catshark)
- Apristurus macrorhynchus S. Tanaka (I), 1909 (flathead catshark)
- Apristurus macrostomus Q. W. Meng, Y. T. Chu & S. Li, 1985 (broadmouth catshark)
- Apristurus manis S. Springer, 1979 (ghost catshark)
- Apristurus manocheriani Cordova & Ebert 2021, (Manocherian's Catshark)
- Apristurus melanoasper Iglésias, Nakaya & Stehmann, 2004 (black roughscale catshark)
- Apristurus microps Gilchrist, 1922 (smalleye catshark)
- Apristurus micropterygeus Q. W. Meng, Y. T. Chu & S. Li, 1986 (smalldorsal catshark)
- Apristurus nakayai Iglésias, 2013 (milk-eye catshark)
- Apristurus nasutus F. de Buen, 1959 (largenose catshark)
- Apristurus ovicorrugatus White, O'Neill, Devloo-Delva, Nakaya & Iglésias, 2023 (ridged-egg catshark)
- Apristurus parvipinnis S. Springer, 1979 & Heemstra, 1979 (smallfin catshark)
- Apristurus pinguis S. M. Deng, G. Q. Xiong & H. X. Zhan, 1983 (bulldog catshark)
- Apristurus platyrhynchus S. Tanaka (I), 1909 (spatulasnout catshark or Borneo catshark)
- Apristurus profundorum Goode & T. H. Bean, 1896 (deepwater catshark)
- Apristurus riveri Bigelow & Schroeder, 1944 (broadgill catshark)
- Apristurus saldanha Barnard, 1925 (Saldanha catshark)
- †Apristurus sereti Adnet, 2006
- Apristurus sibogae M. C. W. Weber, 1913 (pale catshark)
- Apristurus sinensis Y. T. Chu & A. S. Hu, 1981 (South China catshark)
- Apristurus spongiceps C. H. Gilbert, 1905 (spongehead catshark)
- Apristurus stenseni S. Springer, 1979, 1979 (Panama ghost catshark)
- Apristurus yangi White, Mana & Naylor, 2017 (Yang’s longnose catshark)
- Apristurus sp. X Not yet described (Galbraith's catshark)
- Apristurus sp. 3 Not yet described (black wonder catshark)
- Apristurus sp. nov. Not yet described (white-edged catshark)
- Apristurus sp. Not yet described (gray ghost catshark)
