= Asymbolus =

Scientific classification
- Kingdom: Animalia
- Phylum: Chordata
- Class: Chondrichthyes
- Subclass: Elasmobranchii
- Division: Selachii
- Order: Carcharhiniformes
- Family: Pentanchidae
- Genus: Asymbolus; Whitley, 1939

Type species
- Scyllium anale J. D. Ogilby, 1885

Synonyms
- Juncrus (subgenus of Scyliorhinus) Whitley, 1939

Genus of sharks

Asymbolus is a genus of catsharks in the family Pentanchidae, the deepwater catsharks.

== Species ==
The currently recognized species in this genus are:

- Asymbolus analis (J. D. Ogilby, 1885) (Australian spotted catshark)
- Asymbolus funebris Compagno, Stevens & Last, 1999 (blotched catshark)
- Asymbolus galacticus Séret & Last, 2008 (starry catshark)
- Asymbolus occiduus Last, M. F. Gomon & Gledhill, 1999 (western spotted catshark)
- Asymbolus pallidus Last, M. F. Gomon & Gledhill, 1999 (pale spotted catshark)
- Asymbolus parvus Compagno, Stevens & Last, 1999 (dwarf catshark)
- Asymbolus rubiginosus Last, M. F. Gomon & Gledhill, 1999 (orange-spotted catshark)
- Asymbolus submaculatus Compagno, Stevens & Last, 1999 (variegated catshark)
- Asymbolus vincenti (Zietz (fi), 1908) (Gulf catshark)
