= Black roughscale catshark =

Conservation status
- Least Concern (IUCN 3.1)

Scientific classification
- Kingdom: Animalia
- Phylum: Chordata
- Class: Chondrichthyes
- Subclass: Elasmobranchii
- Division: Selachii
- Order: Carcharhiniformes
- Family: Pentanchidae
- Genus: Apristurus
- Species: A. melanoasper

Binomial name
- Apristurus melanoasper Iglésias, Nakaya & Stehmann, 2004

Species of shark

The black roughscale catshark (Apristurus melanoasper) is a species of shark belonging to the family Pentanchidae, the deepwater catsharks. It is recorded from the north Atlantic, eastern South Atlantic, in the Indian Ocean and around Australia and New Zealand. The species can be found on continental shelf at depths between 510 and 1,520 m. It can grow up to 90 cm (35 in).

== Conservation status ==
The New Zealand Department of Conservation has classified the black roughscale catshark as "Data deficient" under the New Zealand Threat Classification System.
