= Amandus Heinrich Christian Zietz =

Amandus Heinrich Christian Zietz (13 June 1840 – 2 August 1921) was a zoologist and paleontologist born in Hamburg, Schleswig-Holstein, and best known for his work at the South Australian Museum in Adelaide, after arriving in South Australia in 1883.

He and his son Frederick Robert Zietz, also a zoologist, worked on preserving bones from a diprotodon skeleton. Along with E. C. Stirling, also at the South Australian museum, he undertook the direction of the first major palaeontology excavation at Lake Callabonna, where a large series of Diprotodont skeletal material was collected. Zietz was responsible for identifying a hitherto unknown species of shark from Investigator Strait, which became known as Asymbolus vincenti, or Gulf catshark.

He is buried in West Terrace Cemetery in Adelaide.

== Works ==
His publications include:

- Stirling, E. C. & Zietz, A. H. C. (1896), "Genyornis newtoni, a fossil struthious bird from Lake Callabonna, South Australia: description of the bones of the leg and foot", Transactions of the Royal Society of South Australia, 20 (2): 191–210
- Stirling, E. C. & Zietz, A. H. C. (1898), "Preliminary notes on Phascolonus gigas, Owen [Phascolomys (Phascolonus) gigas, Owen], and its identity with Sceparnodon ramsayi, Owen", Transactions of the Royal Society of South Australia, 23 (1): 123–133
- Zietz, A. H. C. (1899), "Notes on some fossil reptilian remains from the Warburton River, near Lake Eyre", Transactions of the Royal Society of South Australia, 23 (2): 208–210
- Zietz, A. H. C. (1900), "Description of a new species of Acanthiza (A. tenuirostris)", Transactions of the Royal Society of South Australia, 24 (2): 112
- Zietz, A. H. C. (1902), "List of the edible fish of the lower Murray", Transactions of the Royal Society of South Australia, 26 (2): 265–267
- Zietz, A. H. C. (1906), "A note on some modifications of the mammalian vertebrae", Transactions of the Royal Society of South Australia, 30: 325
- Zietz, A. H. C. (1908), "Description of a hitherto undescribed species of shark from Investigator Strait", Transactions of the Royal Society of South Australia, 32: 287
- Zietz, A. H. C. (1908), "A synopsis of the fishes of South Australia. Parts I and II", Transactions of the Royal Society of South Australia, 32: 287–299
- Zietz, A. H. C. (1909), "A synopsis of the fishes of South Australia. Part III", Transactions of the Royal Society of South Australia, 33: 263–269

== See also ==
- Genyornis
