= Kazuhiro Nakaya =

Japanese marine scientist and ichthyologist (born 1945)

- Born: July 27, 1945 (age 81)
- Education: Hokkaido University
- Scientific career
- Fields: Ichthyology

Kazuhiro Nakaya (仲谷 一宏, Nakaya Kazuhiro; born July 27, 1945) is a Japanese marine scientist and ichthyologist. He graduated from Hokkaido University with a BA in 1968 and with a PhD in 1972. He is professor of Marine Environment and Resources at the Marine Laboratory for Biodiversity. He specializes in taxonomy and evolution of sharks, rays, chimaeras, and Lake Tanganyikan fish. He is the author of many articles and books on sharks and fish. In 1995 he was put in charge of dissecting and preparing the 7th specimen of the very rare megamouth shark.

== Research Field ==
=== New species described by Nakaya and colleagues ===
Family Scyliorhinidae (Cat sharks)

Whitebody catshark (Apristurus albisoma Nakaya & Séret, 1999)</
Largehead catshark (Apristurus ampliceps Sasahara, Sato & Nakaya, 2008)
Catshark (Apristurus aphyodes Nakaya & Stehmann, 1998)
Southern catshark (Apristurus australis Sato, Nakaya & Yorozu, 2008)
Shortbelly catshark (Apristurus breviventralis Kawauchi, Weigmann & Nakaya, 2014)
Softbody catshark (Apristurus exsanguis Sato, Nakaya & Stewart, 1999)
Garricki catshark (Apristurus garricki Sato, Stewart & Nakaya, 2013)
Japanese catshark (Apristurus japonicus Nakaya, 1975)
Longhead catshark (Apristurus longicephalus Nakaya, 1975)
Black roughscale catshark (Apristurus melanoasper Iglésias, Nakaya & Stehmann, 2004)
Broadfin sawtail catshark (Galeus nipponensis Nakaya, 1975)
Izu cat shark (Scyliorhinus tokubee Shirai, Hagiwara & Nakaya, 1992)

== Additional taxa described by him ==
- See Category:Taxa named by Kazuhiro Nakaya
