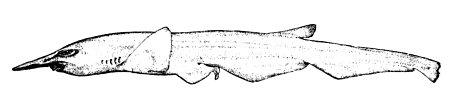
- Pentanchus profundicolus

Scientific classification
- Domain: Eukaryota
- Kingdom: Animalia
- Phylum: Chordata
- Class: Chondrichthyes
- Subclass: Elasmobranchii
- Division: Selachii
- Order: Carcharhiniformes
- Suborder: Carcharhinoidei
- Family: Pentanchidae; H. M. Smith, 1912

Species
- see text

= Pentanchidae =

Family of sharks

Pentanchidae, the deepwater catsharks, is a family of sharks belonging to the order Carcharhiniformes. The deepwater catsharks are found in the Atlantic, Indian and Pacific oceans.

== Genera ==
Pentanchidae contains the following genera:

- Apristurus Garman, 1913
- Asymbolus Whitley, 1939
- Bythaelurus Compagno, 1988
- Cephalurus Bigelow & Schroeder, 1941
- Figaro Whitley 1928
- Galeus Rafinesque, 1810
- Halaelurus Gill, 1862
- Haploblepharus Garman 1913
- Holohalaelurus Fowler, 1934
- Parmaturus Garman, 1906
- Pentanchus H. M. Smith & Radcliffe in H. M. Smith, 1912
