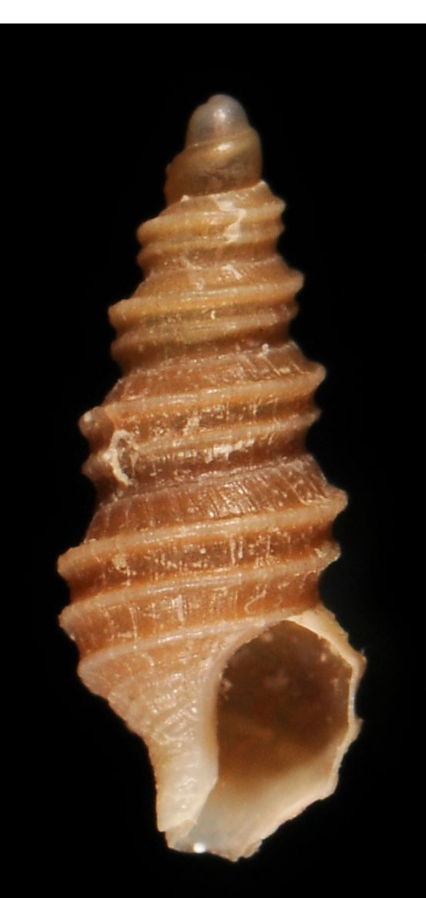
- Shell of Prosipho turritus

Scientific classification
- Kingdom: Animalia
- Phylum: Mollusca
- Class: Gastropoda
- Subclass: Caenogastropoda
- Order: Neogastropoda
- Family: Prosiphonidae
- Genus: Prosipho; Thiele, 1912

Type species
- Prosipho gaussianus Thiele, 1912

= Prosipho =

Genus of gastropods

Prosipho may also refer to the precursor to a siphuncle in cephalopods.

Prosipho is a genus of sea snails, marine gastropod mollusks in the family Prosiphonidae, the true whelks.

== Description ==
(Original description by J. Thiele in German) I would like to create a new group under the name Prosipho.

Compared to the Nordic species, the Antarctic ones are significantly smaller; the largest specimen I have is not yet 12 mm high. All of them show a distinct spiral sculpture on the lower whorls. The lower canal has a very variable length. The initial whorl is usually smooth, sometimes uniquely shaped, but in two species, the upper whorls are covered with longitudinal folds. None of the species mentioned perfectly match the specimens I have.

A left-handed coiling species, of which I only have two empty shells, is so similar to the mirror image of some of these species that it is likely closely related to them.

Dall established the genus Antistreptus for a similar left-handed form which he placed next to Trophon.

== Species ==
Species within the genus Prosipho include:

- Prosipho amiantus Oliver & Picken, 1984
- Prosipho antarctidis (Pelseneer, 1903)
- Prosipho astrolabiensis (Strebel, 1908)
- † Prosipho antarctocostata (Stilwell & Zinsmeister, 1992)
- Prosipho bisculptus Thiele, 1912
- Prosipho certus Thiele, 1912
- Prosipho chordatus (Strebel, 1908)
- Prosipho congenitus Smith, 1915
- Prosipho crassicostatus (Melvill & Standen, 1907)
- † Prosipho delli (Stilwell & Zinsmeister, 1992)
- Prosipho elongatus Thiele, 1912
- Prosipho enricoi Engl, 2004
- Prosipho fuscus Thiele, 1912 (taxon inquirendum)
- Prosipho gaussianus Thiele, 1912
- Prosipho glacialis Thiele, 1912
- Prosipho gracilis Thiele, 1912
- Prosipho grohae Engl, Winfried, 2005
- Prosipho harrietae Engl & Schwabe, 2003
- Prosipho hedleyi Powell, 1958
- Prosipho iodes Oliver & Picken, 1984
- † Prosipho lamesetaensis (Stilwell & Zinsmeister, 1992)
- † Prosipho lawsi (Stilwell & Zinsmeister, 1992)
- Prosipho mundus Smith, 1915
- Prosipho nodosus Thiele, 1912
- Prosipho pellitus Thiele, 1912
- † Prosipho polaris (Stilwell & Zinsmeister, 1992)
- Prosipho propinquus Thiele, 1912
- Prosipho pupa Thiele, 1912
- Prosipho pusillus Thiele, 1912
- Prosipho sindemarkae Engl & Schwabe, 2003
- Prosipho spiralis Thiele, 1912
- Prosipho tomlini Powell, 1957
- Prosipho tuberculatus Smith, 1915
- Prosipho turritus Oliver & Picken, 1984
- Prosipho valdiviae Thiele, 1925
- Prosipho wayae Engl, Winfried, 2005

Synonyms

- Prosipho aurora Hedley, 1916: synonym of Prosipho crassicostatus (Melvill & Standen, 1907) (superseded combination)
- Prosipho cancellatus E. A. Smith, 1915: synonym of Prosipho nodosus Thiele, 1912
- Prosipho contrarius Thiele, 1912: synonym of Antistreptus contrarius (Thiele, 1912) (original combination)
- Prosipho daphnelloides A. W. B. Powell, 1958 : synonym of Prosipho elongatus Thiele, 1912
- Prosipho hunteri Hedley, 1916: synonym of Prosipho nodosus Thiele, 1912 (superseded combination)
- Prosipho macleani Hedley, 1916: synonym of Prosipho mundus E. A. Smith, 1915
- Prosipho madigani Hedley, 1916: synonym of Prosipho mundus E. A. Smith, 1915 (superseded combination)
- Prosipho nestoris (Fleming, 1948): synonym of Liratilia conquisita nestoris C. A. Fleming, 1948 : synonym of Liratilia conquisita conquisita (Suter, 1907) (superseded combination)
- Prosipho reversus Powell, 1958: synonym of Antistreptus reversus (A. W. B. Powell, 1958) (original combination)
- Prosipho perversus A. W. B. Powell, 1951: synonym of Antistreptus perversus (A. W. B. Powell, 1951) (original combination)
- Prosipho priestleyi (Hedley, 1916): synonym of Prosipho glacialis Thiele, 1912
- Prosipho shiraseae Numanami, 1996: synonym of Prosipho nodosus Thiele, 1912
- Prosipho similis Thiele, 1912: synonym of Prosipho antarctidis (Pelseneer, 1903)
- Prosipho torquatus Barnard, 1963: synonym of Belomitra torquata (Barnard, 1963)
