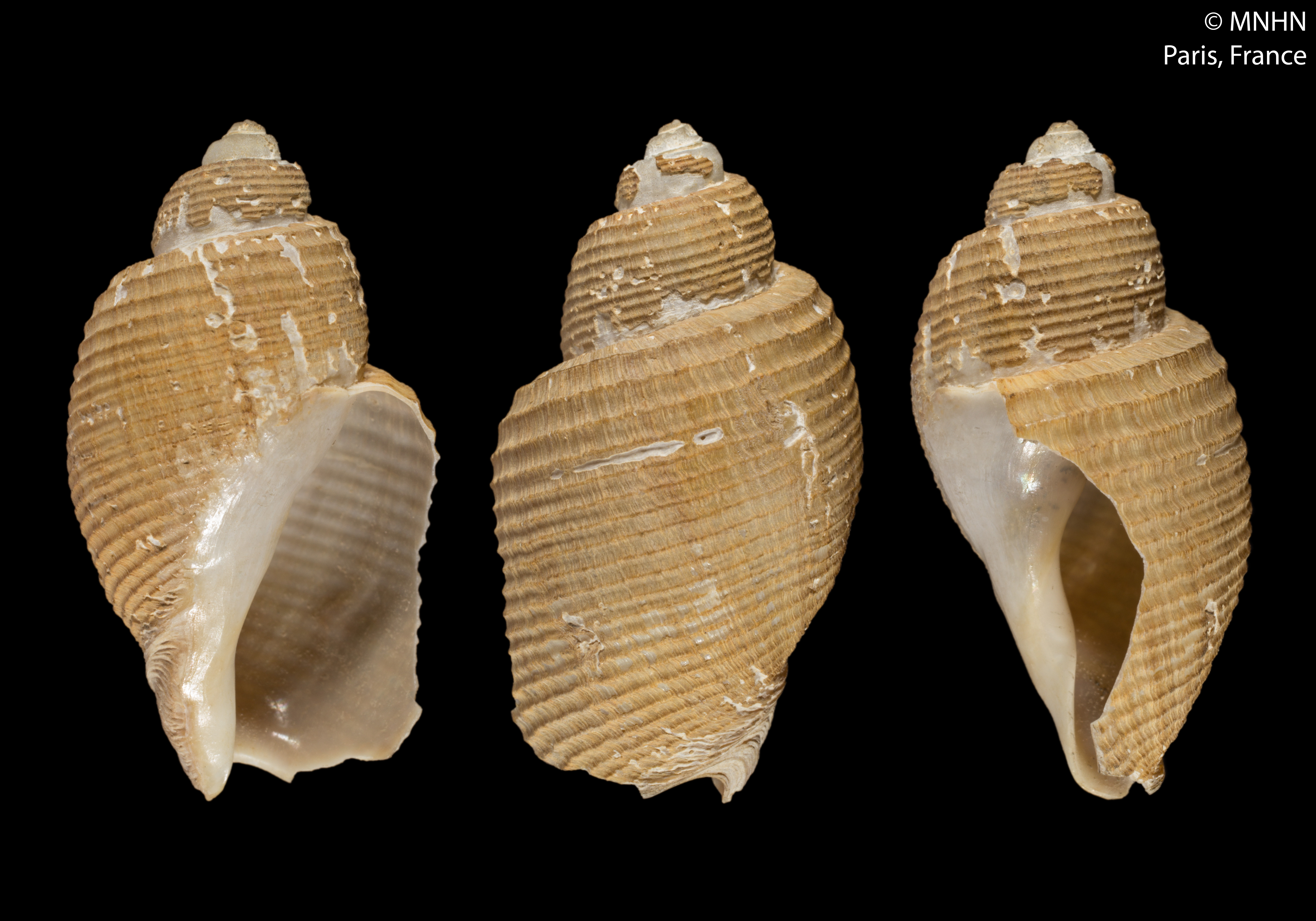
- Shell of Chlanidota signeyana (holotype at MNHN, Paris)

Scientific classification
- Kingdom: Animalia
- Phylum: Mollusca
- Class: Gastropoda
- Subclass: Caenogastropoda
- Order: Neogastropoda
- Superfamily: Buccinoidea
- Family: Prosiphonidae
- Genus: Chlanidota; Martens, 1878

Type species
- Cominella vestita Martens, 1878

Synonyms
- Chlanidota (Paranotoficula) Kantor & Harasewych, 2008· accepted, alternate representation; Cominella (Chlanidota) Martens, 1878; Paranotoficula Kantor & Harasewych, 2008; Pfefferia Strebel, 1908

= Chlanidota =

Genus of gastropods

Chlanidota is a genus of sea snails, marine gastropod mollusks in the family Prosiphonidae, the true whelks.

== Species ==
Species within the genus Chlanidota include:

- Chlanidota anomala Kantor & Harasewych, 2008
- † Chlanidota antarctica (Wilckens, 1910) †
- † Chlanidota antarctohimaleos (Stilwell & Zinsmeister, 1992)
- Chlanidota chordata (Strebel, 1908)
- Chlanidota densesculpta (Martens, 1885)
- Chlanidota invenusta Harasewych & Kantor, 1999
- Chlanidota palliata Strebel, 1908
- Chlanidota paucispiralis Powell, 1951
- Chlanidota pilosa Powell, 1951
- Chlanidota signeyana Powell, 1951
- † Chlanidota tuberosa (Stilwell & Zinsmeister, 1992)
- Chlanidota vestita (Martens, 1878)

Species brought into synonymy

- Chlanidota bisculpta Dell, 1990: synonym of Parabuccinum bisculptum (Dell, 1990) (original combination)
- Chlanidota elongata Lamy, 1910: synonym of Chlanidota signeyana Powell, 1951
- Chlanidota eltanini Dell, 1990: synonym of Parabuccinum eltanini (Dell, 1990) (original combination)
- Chlanidota lamyi Dell, 1990: synonym of Chlanidota signeyana Powell, 1951
- Chlanidota modesta (Martens, 1885): synonym of Chlanidotella modesta (Martens, 1885)
- Chlanidota polyspeira Dell, 1990: synonym of Parabuccinum polyspeirum (Dell, 1990) (original combination)
- Chlanidota pyriformis Dell, 1990: synonym of Chlanidota signeyana Powell, 1951
- Chlanidota smithi Powell, 1958: synonym of Neobuccinum eatoni (E. A. Smith, 1875)
