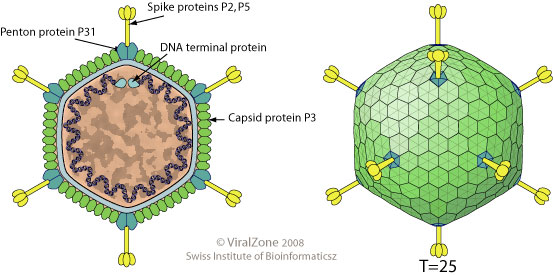
- Internal and external diagram of, Bacillus virus Bam35, in the Tectviridae Family

Virus classification
- (unranked): Virus
- Realm: Varidnaviria
- Kingdom: Bamfordvirae
- Phylum: Preplasmiviricota
- Class: Tectiliviricetes
- Order: Kalamavirales
- Family: Tectiviridae
- Virus: Microbacterium virus MuffinTheCat

Synonyms
- Microbacterium virus Jeffery (Former); Microbacterium phage MuffinTheCat (Synonym)

= Microbacterium virus MuffinTheCat =

Species of virus

Microbacterium virus MuffinTheCat is a species of bacteriophage in the family Tectiviridae. It was collected and identified by Darcy Reimer on 1 October 2019. It is part of the Microbacterium testaceum NRRL B-24232 viral strand and the GE viral cluster. Microbacterium of the Microbacterium testaceum species serve as natural hosts. Microbacterium virus MuffinTheCat is morphologically almost indistinguishable from its sibling species in the Tectiviridae family, but it along with its sibling species in the GE cluster are different enough from other Tectiviridae members that the GE cluster may soon be identified as a new genus. Microbacterium virus MuffinTheCat is identified from other GE cluster members by its genome differences.

== Morphology ==
=== Family specific morphology ===
Microbacterium virus MuffinTheCat shows morphological similarity to other Tectiviridae. They are non-enveloped, icosahedral and have T=25 symmetry, (how the proteins on their surface are arranged, see). They have a virion size of approximately 66 nm and apical spikes of approximately 20 nm. Tectiviridae have a genome of approximately 15kb.

=== Specific genome identification ===
Microbacterium virus MuffinTheCat however, has a genome size of exactly 15494bp (15.494kb) coding for 32 genes and 30 ORFs. This dsDNA genome is flanked by inverted repeats and DNA replication is protein primed. The GC-content of Microbacterium virus MuffinTheCat's genome is 55.1%. GC-content relates to how strong an entity's DNA is, as a higher GC-content means more hydrogen bonds and a structurally stronger genome. Comparatively, most of its sibling species such as Microbacterium virus Badulia have similar genome sizes, but slightly higher GC-content, with Microbacterium virus Badulia having 54.6% GC-content and Microbacterium virus Franklin22 (EB cluster) having 66.1%.

=== Sequencing ===
Genome sequencing of Microbacterium virus MuffinTheCat was conducted by the Pittsburgh Bacteriophage Institute on Dec 12, 2019. It was done using Illumina shotgun sequencing with a total shotgun coverage (amount of sequencing material) of 824. It was during this process that information such as genome size and GC-content was uncovered.

== Discovery and habitat ==
=== Discovery ===
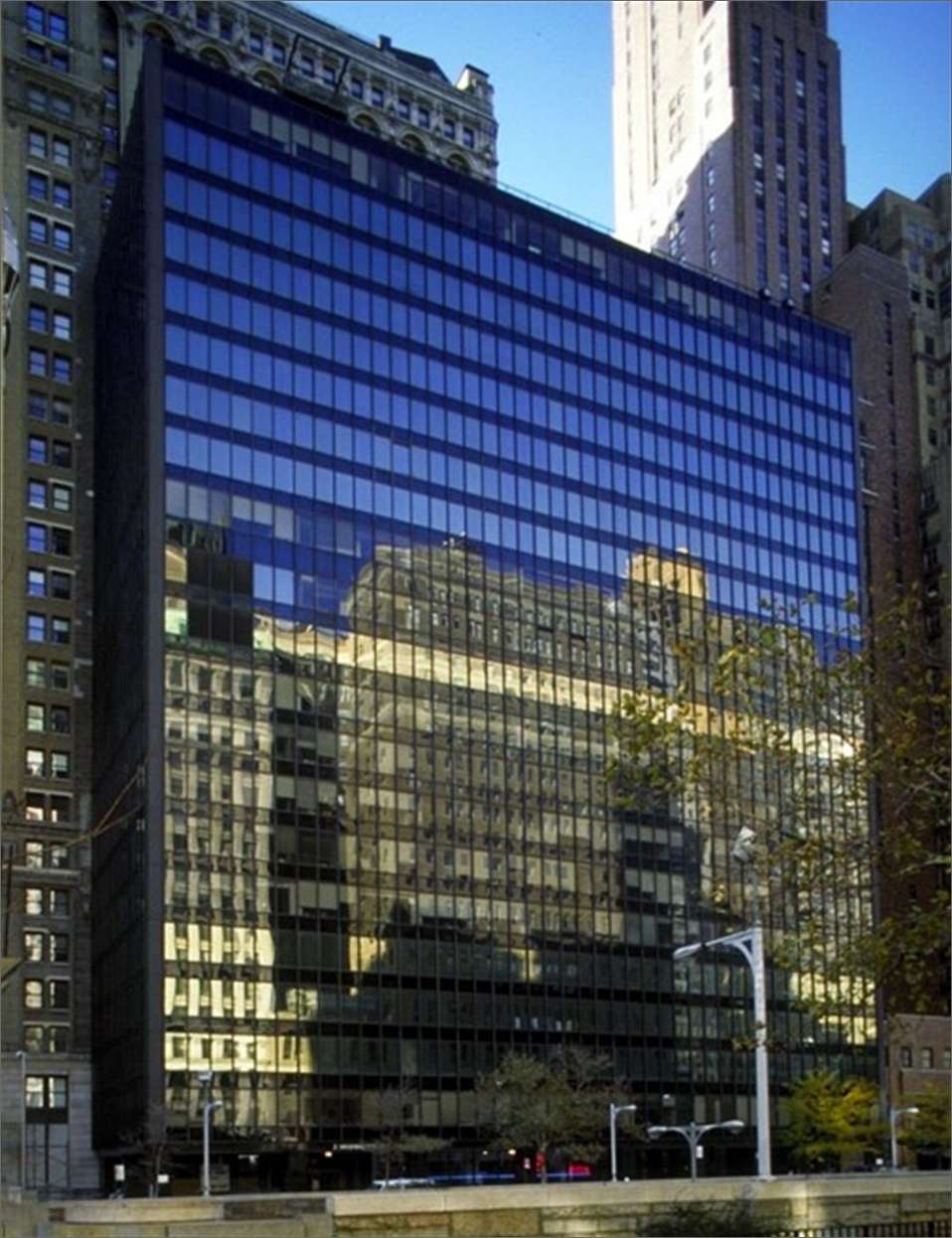
Nyack College, New York City

Microbacterium virus MuffinTheCat was discovered by Darcy Reimer in 2019 in Nyack, New York, United States, from an enriched soil sample from a moist area of a mostly dried-up riverbed. It was discovered via the Science Education Alliance-Phage Hunters Advancing Genomics and Evolutionary Science Program at Nyack College.

=== Habitat ===
Its host species Microbacterium testaceum (Strain, NRRL B-24232) infects plants such as potatoes or rice, this interspecific relationship is relatively commensal. Therefore it is presumed that Microbacterium virus MuffinTheCat infects strands or even reproductively isolated subspecies of Microbacterium testaceum that harbour freshwater plant life or deep-rooted riverside plants. However, this is relatively speculative as only one known sample has been taken of this bacteriophage species.

=== Naming ===
Microbacterium virus MuffinTheCat was originally named Microbacterium virus Jeffery. A member of the discovery project stated "Jeffrey is a good name for a phage, picked randomly." However, this name was changed to MuffinTheCat. It is evident from scientific classifications such as Streptomyces phage Forthebois, which was a name emerging from the same identification project, that the college students that were a part of this program naturally got to name the species they discovered. Muffin the cat is likely the identifier Darcy Reimer's cat or a domesticated cat that is close to them. This claim is backed up by the naming of Mycobacterium phage DaisytheDog also identified by Nyack College with the naming notes stating, "My friend's dog who looks a lot like Air Bud is the reason for the name." This shows the naming of Microbacterium virus MuffinTheCat was likely not random and was named after a cat called Muffin. Disregarding the species Pellonula leonensis which has a common name; Muffin sprat, Microbacterium virus MuffinTheCat is one of 2 species with "Muffin" in its scientific classification. The other being a mollusk in the Buccinidae family, Muffinbuccinum catherinae.

== Taxonomy ==
=== Taxonomic relatives ===
Parent Genus:

- Unclassified

Parent Family:

- Tectiviridae

Kingdom:

- Bamfordvirae

Sibling Strand Species:

GE cluster:

- Microbacterium phage Badulia
- Microbacterium phage DesireeRose
- Microbacterium phage LuzDeMundo

EB cluster:

- Microbacterium phage Franklin22

Undefined cluster: (Not sequenced)

- Microbacterium phage Bee17
- Microbacterium phage CharleeAnn
- Microbacterium phage Gargantuan
- Microbacterium phage Plimp
- Microbacterium phage SCoupsA
- Microbacterium phage Sticker

Sibling and Cousin Species and Their Genera (Under Tectiviridae):

- Alphatectivirus
  - Pseudomonas virus PR4
  - Pseudomonas virus PRD1
- Betatectivirus
  - Bacillus virus AP50
  - Bacillus virus Bam35
  - Bacillus virus GIL16
  - Bacillus virus Wip1
- Deltatectivirus
  - Streptomyces virus Forthebois
  - Streptomyces virus WheeHeim
- Epsilontectivirus
  - Rhodococcus virus Toil
- Gammatectivirus
  - Gluconobacter virus GC1
- Undefined
  - Thermus virus phiKo
