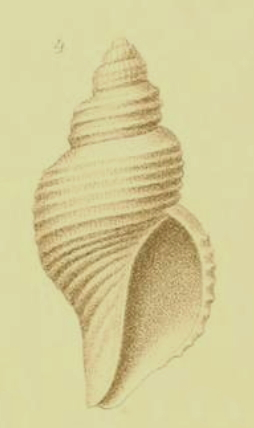
- Shell of Prosipho bisculptus (holotype)

Scientific classification
- Kingdom: Animalia
- Phylum: Mollusca
- Class: Gastropoda
- Subclass: Caenogastropoda
- Order: Neogastropoda
- Family: Prosiphonidae
- Genus: Prosipho
- Species: P. bisculptus

Binomial name
- Prosipho bisculptus Thiele, 1912

= Prosipho bisculptus =

Species of gastropod

Prosipho bisculptus is a species of sea snail, a marine gastropod mollusk in the family Prosiphonidae, the true whelks.

== Description ==
(Original description in German) Based on the available material, this is the largest species in its genus. While its general shape is similar to Prosipho gaussianus Thiele, 1912, it is uniquely distinguished by its initial whorls, which are covered in sparse, narrow radial folds rather than being smooth. A fresh shell of this species also features rows of fairly long, horny bristles.

The largest available specimen measures 11.5 mm high and 5.5 mm wide and has 5 whorls. The first two whorls show only the characteristic folds, which continue onto the third whorl before gradually fading. As a result, the last two whorls only exhibit the spiral ridges and dense growth lines.

The third whorl begins with only three ridges, which quickly increase to seven above the aperture. The body whorl has four distinct ridges and some less prominent ones on the lower process. The whorls are convex, and the body whorl is large with a straight lower process. The aperture is long and quite narrow, with an outer margin that is arched at the top and almost straight at the bottom.

== Distribution ==
This species occurs in the Davis Sea and the Ross Sea, Antarctica.
