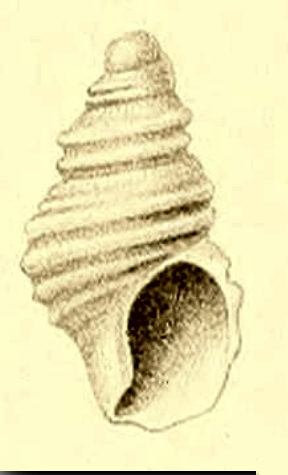
- Shell of Prosipho pusillus (holotype)

Scientific classification
- Kingdom: Animalia
- Phylum: Mollusca
- Class: Gastropoda
- Subclass: Caenogastropoda
- Order: Neogastropoda
- Family: Prosiphonidae
- Genus: Prosipho
- Species: P. pusillus

Binomial name
- Prosipho pusillus Thiele, 1912

= Prosipho pusillus =

Species of gastropod

Prosipho pusillus is a species of sea snail, a marine gastropod mollusk in the family Prosiphonidae, the true whelks.

== Description ==
(Original description in German) A few specimens are quite similar to Prosipho crassicostatus (Melvill & Standen, 1907), but in the latter, the first 2-3 whorls are said to be smooth, while here only the first 1.5 are. The size is also slightly different, and the spiral ridges on the body whorl are somewhat different.

The first 1.5 whorls are smooth and rounded, and the remaining three are covered with strong spiral ridges. Under the suture, each whorl suddenly widens, which makes the suture appear sunken. The middle whorls have two ridges; a weaker one appears above them on the body whorl, and on the underside, there is initially a strong one, then a weaker one, and a few indistinct ones. The fresh shell is translucent.

The columella is obliquely truncated at the bottom, and the aperture is quite large, with an arched outer margin, so the siphonal canal is hardly separated. The height is 4.3 mm and the diameter is 2.25 mm.

The radula is similar to that of Prosipho antarctidis (Pelseneer, 1903). The central plate is a rounded rectangle with three short, pointed denticles. The lateral plates have fairly wide cutting edges. The two outer prongs are separated only at the tip, with the outermost one being shorter. The next prong is large and is separated by deep incisions, while the innermost one is considerably smaller. Additionally, a small denticle may be developed at the outermost corner.

== Distribution ==
This species occurs in Antarctic waters.
