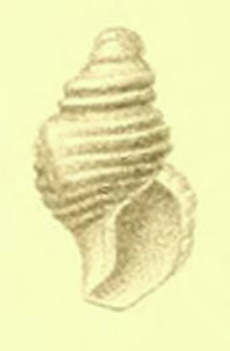
- Shell of Prosipho fuscus (holotype)

Scientific classification
- Kingdom: Animalia
- Phylum: Mollusca
- Class: Gastropoda
- Subclass: Caenogastropoda
- Order: Neogastropoda
- Family: Prosiphonidae
- Genus: Prosipho
- Species: P. fuscus

Binomial name
- Prosipho fuscus Thiele, 1912

= Prosipho fuscus =

Species of gastropod

Prosipho fuscus is a species of sea snail, a marine gastropod mollusk in the family Prosiphonidae, the true whelks.

This is a taxon inquirendum.

== Description ==
(Original description in German) Unlike other known species in its genus, this species is distinctively brown. While similar in shape to Prosipho pupa, it's easy to tell apart.

This shell, which may be immature, is 3 mm high and 1.7 mm wide with four whorls. The first 1.5 whorls are smooth, while the next two have strong spiral ridges. The slightly flattened body whorl has four strong ridges and a couple of weaker ones on the underside. Interestingly, the body whorl also has a strong varix-like bulge on its upper third that fades out towards the bottom. The siphonal canal is moderately long and lacks a sharp transition from the main body of the shell. The aperture is a somewhat angled oval with a short, slanted breathing tube.

== Distribution ==
This species occurs off the Kerguelen Islands.
