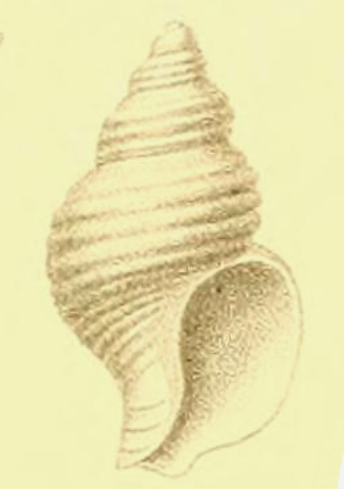
- Shell of Prosipho certus (holotype)

Scientific classification
- Kingdom: Animalia
- Phylum: Mollusca
- Class: Gastropoda
- Subclass: Caenogastropoda
- Order: Neogastropoda
- Family: Prosiphonidae
- Genus: Prosipho
- Species: P. certus

Binomial name
- Prosipho certus Thiele, 1912

= Prosipho certus =

Species of gastropod

Prosipho certus is a species of sea snail, a marine gastropod mollusk in the family Prosiphonidae, the true whelks.

== Description ==
(Original description in German) The shell measures almost 5 mm high and 2.75 mm wide, and consists of 4.5 whorls that grow in size quite quickly. The whorls are curved and separated by a slightly indented seam. The first 1.5 whorls are smooth, but the rest have spiral ridges. The number of ridges increases from three to four on the upper whorls, and the final, enlarged whorl has about 12 ridges, with the strongest ones located around its widest part.

The shell has a moderately long, slightly curved spout-like tube called a siphonal canal. The aperture is large and oval-shaped with a short, slanted breathing tube.

A microscopic look at its radula, or tooth-like tongue, reveals it's very similar to that of Prosipho gaussianus. The side plate of the radula has a narrow cutting edge with three points, and the one closest to the center is the largest.
