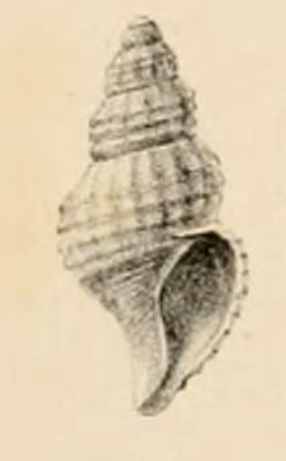
- Shell of Prosipho congenitus (holotype)

Scientific classification
- Kingdom: Animalia
- Phylum: Mollusca
- Class: Gastropoda
- Subclass: Caenogastropoda
- Order: Neogastropoda
- Family: Prosiphonidae
- Genus: Prosipho
- Species: P. congenitus

Binomial name
- Prosipho congenitus Smith, 1915

= Prosipho congenitus =

Species of gastropod

Prosipho congenitus is a species of sea snail, a marine gastropod mollusk in the family Prosiphonidae, the true whelks.

== Description ==
The length of the shell attains 7.5 mm, its diameter 3.5 mm.

(Original description) The shell is shortly fusiform and whitish in color, containing five whorls.

The first two whorls are smooth and convex, forming a dome-like apex. The next two whorls are also convex and feature four spiral lirae (ridges), with the uppermost one being finer than the others. The body whorl has five main lirae and about thirteen much finer ones below them. The stronger lirae on the spire are somewhat nodose due to being crossed by about fifteen faintly developed longitudinal folds on the penultimate whorl.

The aperture is pear-shaped. The columella is arched at the top and oblique at the front, with an oblique and recurved siphonal canal.

== Distribution ==
This marine species occurs off Oates Land, East Antarctica.
