= Chlanidota vestita =

Scientific classification
- Kingdom: Animalia
- Phylum: Mollusca
- Class: Gastropoda
- Subclass: Caenogastropoda
- Order: Neogastropoda
- Family: Prosiphonidae
- Genus: Chlanidota
- Species: C. vestita

Binomial name
- Chlanidota vestita (Martens, 1878)

Species of gastropod

Chlanidota vestita is a species of sea snail, a marine gastropod mollusk in the family Prosiphonidae, the true whelks.
