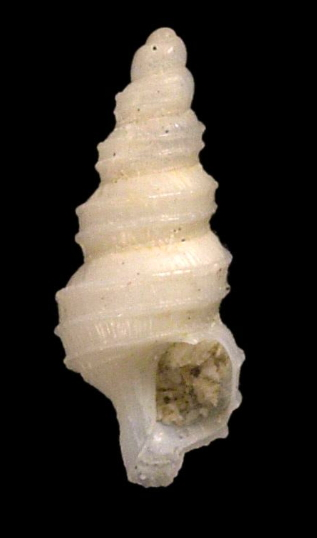
- Shell of Prosipho hedleyi (specimen at the Smithsonian Institution)

Scientific classification
- Kingdom: Animalia
- Phylum: Mollusca
- Class: Gastropoda
- Subclass: Caenogastropoda
- Order: Neogastropoda
- Family: Prosiphonidae
- Genus: Prosipho
- Species: P. hedleyi

Binomial name
- Prosipho hedleyi Powell, 1958

= Prosipho hedleyi =

Species of gastropod

Prosipho hedleyi is a species of sea snail, a marine gastropod mollusk in the family Prosiphonidae, the true whelks.

== Description ==
The length of the shell attains 6 mm.

== Distribution ==
This marine species occurs off the Antarctic Peninsula and in the Ross Sea.
