= Probuccinum costatum =

Scientific classification
- Kingdom: Animalia
- Phylum: Mollusca
- Class: Gastropoda
- Subclass: Caenogastropoda
- Order: Neogastropoda
- Family: Buccinidae
- Genus: Probuccinum
- Species: P. costatum

Binomial name
- Probuccinum costatum Thiele, 1912

Species of gastropod

Probuccinum costatum is a species of sea snail, a marine gastropod mollusk in the family Prosiphonidae, the true whelks.

== Distribution ==
This species occurs in the Davis Sea.
