= Meteuthria multituberculata =

Scientific classification
- Kingdom: Animalia
- Phylum: Mollusca
- Class: Gastropoda
- Subclass: Caenogastropoda
- Order: Neogastropoda
- Family: Prosiphonidae
- Genus: Meteuthria
- Species: M. multituberculata

Binomial name
- Meteuthria multituberculata Dell, 1990

Synonyms
- Anomacme multituberculata Castellanos, Rolán & Bartolotta, 1987 superseded combination

Species of gastropod

Meteuthria multituberculata is a species of sea snail, a marine gastropod mollusk in the family Prosiphonidae, the true whelks.

Subspecies

- Meteuthria multituberculata multituberculata (Castellanos, Rolán & Bartolotta, 1987)
- Meteuthria multituberculata rossiana Dell, 1990

== Distribution ==
This species occurs in the Strait of Magellan.
