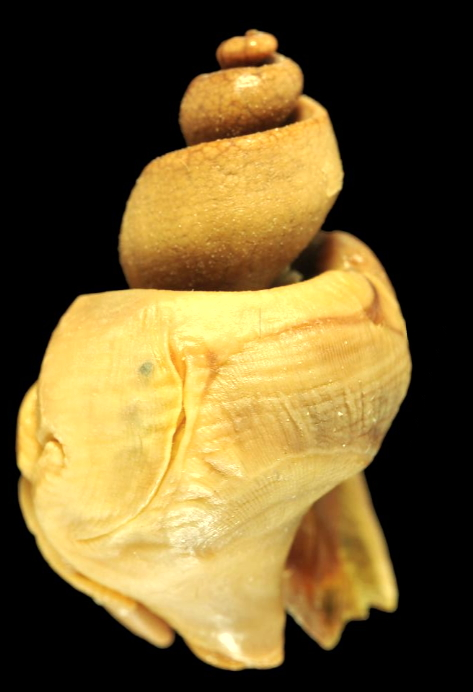
- Shell of Antarctodomus thielei

Scientific classification
- Kingdom: Animalia
- Phylum: Mollusca
- Class: Gastropoda
- Subclass: Caenogastropoda
- Order: Neogastropoda
- Family: Prosiphonidae
- Genus: Antarctodomus; A. Adams, 1863

= Antarctodomus =

Genus of gastropods

Antarctodomus is a genus of sea snails, marine gastropod mollusks in the family Prosiphonidae, the true whelks.

== Species ==
Species within the genus Antarctodomus include:

- Antarctodomus powelli Dell, 1995
- Antarctodomus thielei (Powell, 1958)

Synonyms

- Antarctodomus okutanii Numanami, 1996: synonym of Falsitromina okutanii (Numanami, 1996) (original combination)
