= Prosipho tomlini =

Scientific classification
- Kingdom: Animalia
- Phylum: Mollusca
- Class: Gastropoda
- Subclass: Caenogastropoda
- Order: Neogastropoda
- Family: Prosiphonidae
- Genus: Prosipho
- Species: P. tomlini

Binomial name
- Prosipho tomlini A. W. B. Powell, 1957

Species of gastropod

Prosipho tomlini is a species of sea snail, a marine gastropod mollusk in the family Prosiphonidae, the true whelks.

== Distribution ==
This marine species occurs off Macquarie Islands.
