= Falsimohnia albozonata =

Scientific classification
- Kingdom: Animalia
- Phylum: Mollusca
- Class: Gastropoda
- Subclass: Caenogastropoda
- Order: Neogastropoda
- Family: Prosiphonidae
- Genus: Falsimohnia
- Species: F. albozonata

Binomial name
- Falsimohnia albozonata (Watson), 1886)

Species of gastropod

Falsimohnia albozonata is a species of sea snail, a marine gastropod mollusk in the family Prosiphonidae, the true whelks.
