= Probuccinum angulatum =

Scientific classification
- Kingdom: Animalia
- Phylum: Mollusca
- Class: Gastropoda
- Subclass: Caenogastropoda
- Order: Neogastropoda
- Family: Buccinidae
- Genus: Probuccinum
- Species: P. angulatum

Binomial name
- Probuccinum angulatum A.W.B. Powell, 1951

Species of gastropod

Probuccinum angulatum is a species of sea snail, a marine gastropod mollusk in the family Prosiphonidae, the true whelks.
