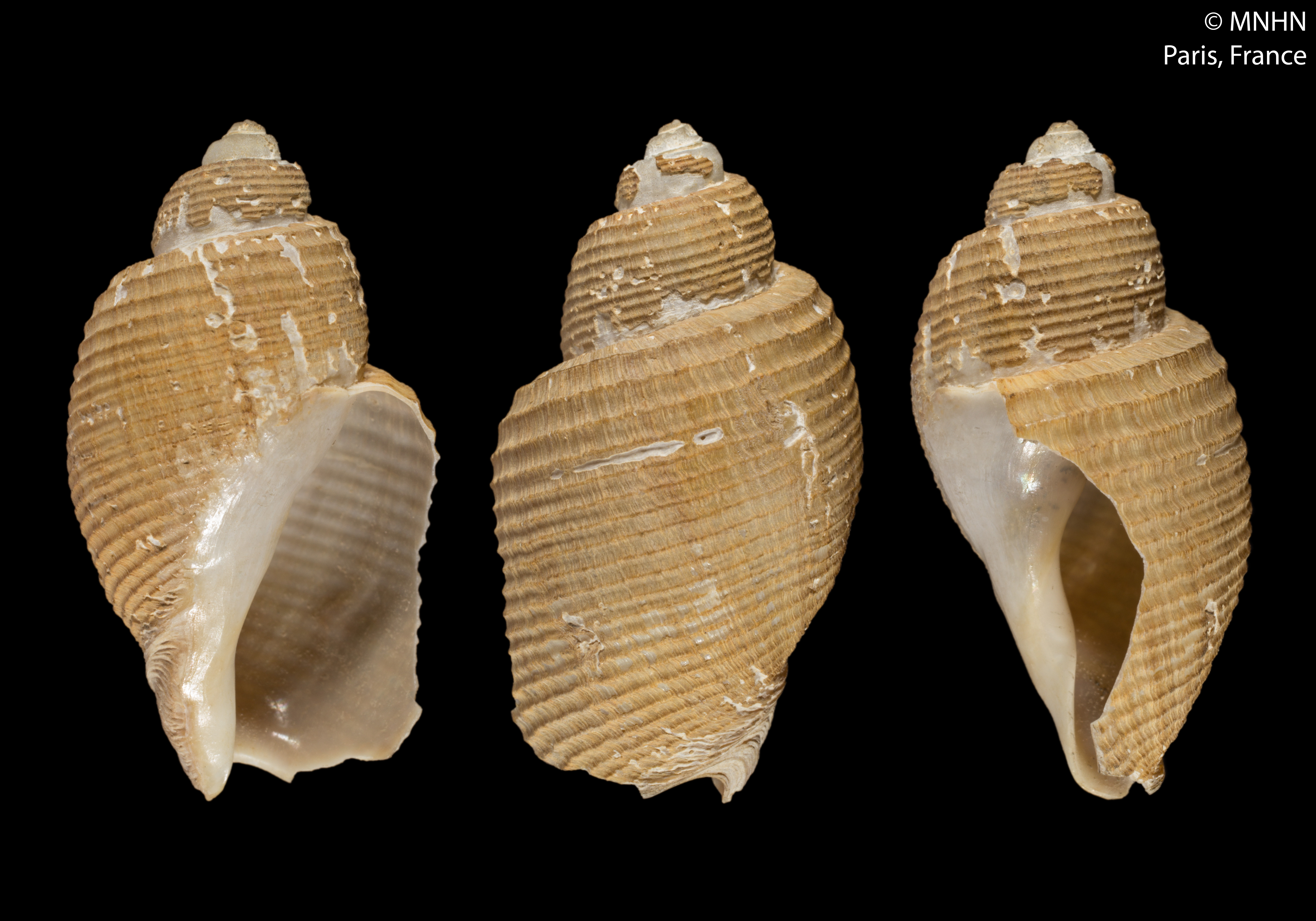
- Shell of Chlanidota signeyana (holotype at MNHN, Paris)

Scientific classification
- Kingdom: Animalia
- Phylum: Mollusca
- Class: Gastropoda
- Subclass: Caenogastropoda
- Order: Neogastropoda
- Family: Prosiphonidae
- Genus: Chlanidota
- Species: C. signeyana

Binomial name
- Chlanidota signeyana Powell, 1951

Synonyms
- Chlanidota elongata (Lamy, 1910); Chlanidota lamyi Dell, 1990; Chlanidota pyriformis Dell, 1990; Cominella vestita var. elongata Lamy, 1910 (invalid: junior secondary homonym of Cominella elongata (Dunker, 1857); Chlanidota lamyi is a replacement name)

= Chlanidota signeyana =

Species of gastropod

Chlanidota signeyana is a species of sea snail, a marine gastropod mollusk in the family Prosiphonidae, the true whelks. It was described by Harold Powell in 1951.

== Distribution ==
This marine species occurs off Timor.
