= Falsimohnia anderssoni =

Scientific classification
- Kingdom: Animalia
- Phylum: Mollusca
- Class: Gastropoda
- Subclass: Caenogastropoda
- Order: Neogastropoda
- Superfamily: Buccinoidea
- Family: Prosiphonidae
- Genus: Falsimohnia
- Species: F. anderssoni

Binomial name
- Falsimohnia anderssoni (Strebel, 1908)

Synonyms
- Bela anderssoni Strebel, 1908 (original combination)

Species of mollusc

Falsimohnia anderssoni is a species of sea snail, a marine gastropod mollusk in the family Prosiphonidae.
