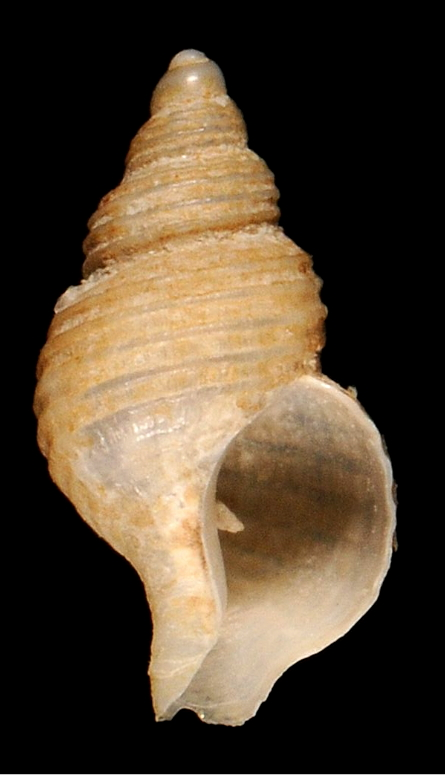
- Shell of Prosipho chordatus (specimen at the Smithsonian Institution)

Scientific classification
- Kingdom: Animalia
- Phylum: Mollusca
- Class: Gastropoda
- Subclass: Caenogastropoda
- Order: Neogastropoda
- Family: Prosiphonidae
- Genus: Prosipho
- Species: P. chordatus

Binomial name
- Prosipho chordatus (Strebel, 1908)

Synonyms
- Sipho chordatus Strebel, 1908 (original combination)

= Prosipho chordatus =

Species of gastropod

Prosipho chordatus is a species of sea snail, a marine gastropod mollusk in the family Prosiphonidae, the true whelks.

== Description ==
(Original description in German) This thin, yet solid, turreted shell has a relatively blunt apex and has a light brownish-yellow color. Its interior and columella are white. The shell's 6.5 convex whorls are separated by a deep suture. The body whorl is constricted at the base and ends in a short, wide siphonal canal.

The sculpture features fine growth lines, and in young specimens, a few rib-like folds are visible on the second whorl. The most prominent feature is the spiral sculpture, which consists of fairly high ridges.

Below the suture, there is a narrow, smooth zone. This is followed by a narrow ridge and then stronger ridges that are slightly narrower than the spaces between them. In these interspaces, the cuticle has a compressed or fibrous appearance. Toward the base of the shell, the ridges become weaker and more crowded. There are five ridges on the penultimate whorl and 15 on the body whorl.

== Distribution ==
This marine species occurs off South Georgia and the South Sandwich Islands.
