= Falsimohnia hoshiaii =

Scientific classification
- Kingdom: Animalia
- Phylum: Mollusca
- Class: Gastropoda
- Subclass: Caenogastropoda
- Order: Neogastropoda
- Family: Prosiphonidae
- Genus: Falsimohnia
- Species: F. hoshiaii

Binomial name
- Falsimohnia hoshiaii (Numanami, 1996)

Synonyms
- Pareuthria hoshiaii Numanami, 1996 (original combination)

Species of gastropod

Falsimohnia hoshiaii is a species of sea snail, a marine gastropod mollusk in the family Prosiphonidae, the true whelks.
