= Parabuccinum rauscherti =

Scientific classification
- Kingdom: Animalia
- Phylum: Mollusca
- Class: Gastropoda
- Subclass: Caenogastropoda
- Order: Neogastropoda
- Family: Prosiphonidae
- Genus: Parabuccinum
- Species: P. rauscherti

Binomial name
- Parabuccinum rauscherti Harasewych, Kantor & Linse, 2000

Species of gastropod

Parabuccinum rauscherti is a species of sea snail, a marine gastropod mollusk in the family Prosiphonidae.
