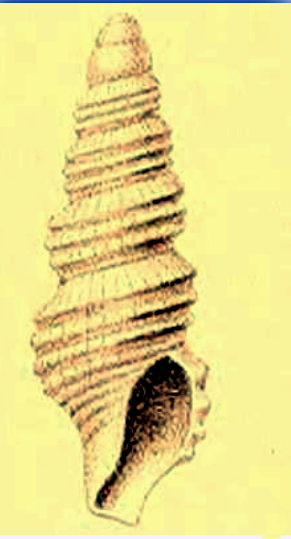
- Drawing of Prosipho gracilis (holotype)

Scientific classification
- Kingdom: Animalia
- Phylum: Mollusca
- Class: Gastropoda
- Subclass: Caenogastropoda
- Order: Neogastropoda
- Family: Prosiphonidae
- Genus: Prosipho
- Species: P. gracilis

Binomial name
- Prosipho gracilis Thiele, 1912

= Prosipho gracilis =

Species of gastropod

Prosipho gracilis is a species of sea snail, a marine gastropod mollusk in the family Prosiphonidae, the true whelks.

== Description ==
(Original description in German) Some shells are considerably more slender than Prosipho antarctidis (Pelseneer, 1903), reaching about 6 mm in height and 1.8 mm in width. The first two whorls are smooth, less spherical, and narrower. The following 4–4.5 whorls have three strong spiral ridges. During the fourth whorl, the suture becomes attached. A few weaker ridges are present on the underside of the body whorl. Fine, more or less regular folds run down over the whorls. In well-preserved specimens, short, bristle-like outgrowths of the periostracum stand on the ridges at the intersections. The aperture is quite narrow, tapering downward into a slightly oblique, moderately elongated siphonal canal.

== Distribution ==
This species occurs in the Davis Sea, Antarctica.
