= Prosipho iodes =

Scientific classification
- Kingdom: Animalia
- Phylum: Mollusca
- Class: Gastropoda
- Subclass: Caenogastropoda
- Order: Neogastropoda
- Family: Prosiphonidae
- Genus: Prosipho
- Species: P. iodes

Binomial name
- Prosipho iodes Oliver & Picken, 1984

Species of gastropod

Prosipho iodes is a species of sea snail, a marine gastropod mollusk in the family Prosiphonidae, the true whelks.

== Description ==
The length of the shell attains 7 mm.

== Distribution ==
This marine species occurs off Signy Island, South Orkney Islands.
