= Probuccinum archibenthale =

- Original image of a shell of Probuccinum archibenthale

Scientific classification
- Kingdom: Animalia
- Phylum: Mollusca
- Class: Gastropoda
- Subclass: Caenogastropoda
- Order: Neogastropoda
- Superfamily: Buccinoidea
- Family: Buccinidae
- Genus: Probuccinum
- Species: P. archibenthale

Binomial name
- Probuccinum archibenthale (Melvill & Standen, 1907)

Synonyms
- Chrysodomus (Sipho) archibenthalis Melvill & Standen, 1907; Chrysodomus archibenthalis Melvill & Standen, 1907 (original combination); Pontiothauma archibentalis Dell, 1990

Species of gastropod

Probuccinum archibenthale is a species of sea snail, a marine gastropod mollusk in the family Prosiphonidae.

== Description ==
The length of the shell attains 17 mm, its diameter 8 mm.

The fusiform shell is slender and has a dark white color. The damaged holotype contains six whorls, including two smooth apical whorls. The others are impressed at the suture, swollen and contain spiral lirae (12 on the body whorl). The aperture is ovate. The columella is somewhat twisted. The yellow operculum is unguiform, horny and has an apical nucleus.

Evidently not adult, and though this be the case, and the outer lip be to some extent broken away, the author thinks this species is worth describing, the upper whorls being very perfect. The ventricose, closely spirally lirate whorls seem characteristic. Only one specimen occurred, from the abysmal depth recorded. It may be many years before another specimen is brought to light. We should imagine a full-grown shell would be at least twice the size, say 35 mm. in length.

== Distribution ==
This benthal species was found south off South Georgia
