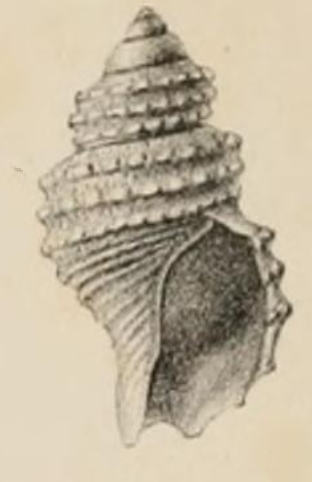
- Shell of Prosipho tuberculatus (holotype)

Scientific classification
- Kingdom: Animalia
- Phylum: Mollusca
- Class: Gastropoda
- Subclass: Caenogastropoda
- Order: Neogastropoda
- Family: Prosiphonidae
- Genus: Prosipho
- Species: P. tuberculatus

Binomial name
- Prosipho tuberculatus Smith, 1915

= Prosipho tuberculatus =

Species of gastropod

Prosipho tuberculatus is a species of sea snail, a marine gastropod mollusk in the family Prosiphonidae, the true whelks.

== Description ==
The length of the shell attains 5 mm, its diameter 2.75 mm.

(original description) This shell is shortly fusiform and has a dirty whitish color. It contains 4.5 whorls.

The first 1.5 whorls are smooth and convex, forming a rounded, nipple-like apex. The next three whorls have four spiral lirae (ridges), while the body whorl has thirteen. The two or three uppermost lirae on the body whorl, like those on the spire, are finely nodular where they are crossed by approximately twenty longitudinal threads on the penultimate whorl. The entire surface is covered with fine growth lines.

The aperture is pear-shaped and smooth. It is white inside. It measures less than half the length of the shell. The columella is arched at the top and oblique at the bottom, and the siphonal canal is moderately broad, oblique, and slightly curved back.

== Distribution ==
This marine species was found in de McMurdo Sound, Antarctica.
