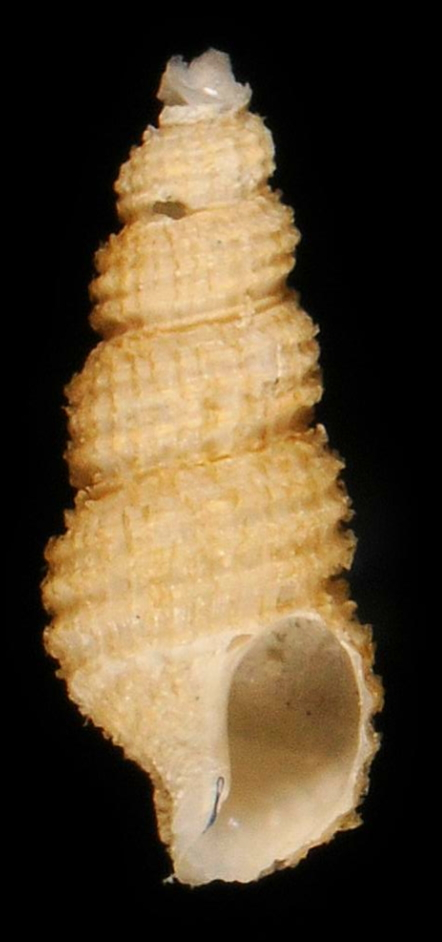
- Shell of Prosipho pellitus (specimen at the Smithsonian Institution)

Scientific classification
- Kingdom: Animalia
- Phylum: Mollusca
- Class: Gastropoda
- Subclass: Caenogastropoda
- Order: Neogastropoda
- Family: Prosiphonidae
- Genus: Prosipho
- Species: P. pellitus

Binomial name
- Prosipho pellitus Thiele, 1912

= Prosipho pellitus =

Species of gastropod

Prosipho pellitus is a species of sea snail, a marine gastropod mollusk in the family Prosiphonidae, the true whelks.

== Description ==
(Original description in German) The shell is 5.3 mm high and 2 mm wide, formed from 6.5 whorls, of which the first two are smooth and rounded. The remaining whorls are covered with spiral ridges, each with three ridges, while the last one has a fourth in the continuation of the suture. The whorls are somewhat flattened and separated by an impressed suture. The short siphonal canal is sharply set off upwards; the aperture is ovoid with a slanted breathing tube.

== Distribution ==
This marine species occurs in the Scotia Sea, Antarctica.
