= Falsitromina bella =

Scientific classification
- Kingdom: Animalia
- Phylum: Mollusca
- Class: Gastropoda
- Subclass: Caenogastropoda
- Order: Neogastropoda
- Family: Prosiphonidae
- Genus: Falsitromina
- Species: F. brlla

Binomial name
- Falsitromina brlla (Powell, 1951)

Species of gastropod

Falsitromina bella is a species of sea snail, a marine gastropod mollusk in the family Prosiphonidae.
