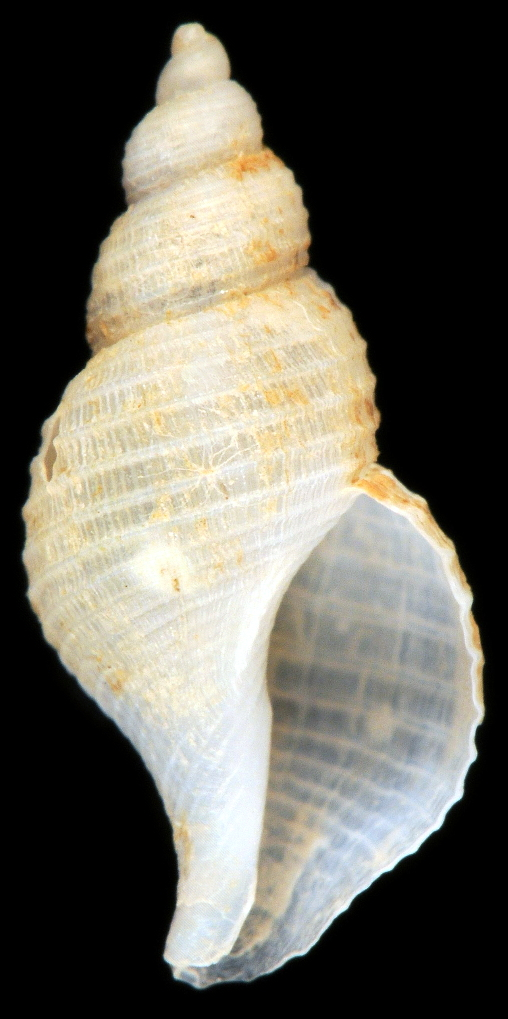
- Shell of Prosipho elongatus (specimen at the Smithsonian Institution)

Scientific classification
- Kingdom: Animalia
- Phylum: Mollusca
- Class: Gastropoda
- Subclass: Caenogastropoda
- Order: Neogastropoda
- Family: Prosiphonidae
- Genus: Prosipho
- Species: P. elongatus

Binomial name
- Prosipho elongatus Thiele, 1912

Synonyms
- Prosipho daphnelloides A. W. B. Powell, 1958

= Prosipho elongatus =

Species of gastropod

Prosipho elongatus is a species of sea snail, a marine gastropod mollusk in the family Prosiphonidae, the true whelks.

== Description ==
(Original description in German) This species is characterized by its slender form, a long siphonal canal, and a pointed initial whorl. A few poorly preserved shells were recovered from the Gauss Station.

The largest of these, though slightly damaged, measures ten mm high and four mm wide and consists of 4.5 whorls. The first 1.5 whorls are drawn out to a sharp point and are smooth, while the subsequent whorls are covered with spiral ridges. The whorls are relatively flatly curved, with the middle ones featuring seven ridges. These ridges are also present on the underside of the body whorl and extend onto its long, drawn-out process.

Dense, slightly wrinkled growth lines cover the surface. On fresh shells, these lines correspond to distinct folds in the fairly strong, brownish periostracum. The aperture is narrow, gradually transitioning into the siphonal canal at the base.

== Distribution ==
This species occurs in the Ross Sea, Antarctica.
