= Germonea rachelae =

Scientific classification
- Kingdom: Animalia
- Phylum: Mollusca
- Class: Gastropoda
- Subclass: Caenogastropoda
- Order: Neogastropoda
- Family: Prosiphonidae
- Genus: Germonea
- Species: G. rachelae

Binomial name
- Germonea rachelae Harasewych & Kantor, 2004

Species of gastropod

Germonea rachelae is a species of sea snail, a marine gastropod mollusk in the family Prosiphonidae.

== Description ==
The shells of most species of sea snails are spirally coiled.

== Distribution ==
The deep-sea of the Scotia Sea and adjacent abyssal plains and trenches.
