= Bathydomus =

Scientific classification
- Kingdom: Animalia
- Phylum: Mollusca
- Class: Gastropoda
- Subclass: Caenogastropoda
- Order: Neogastropoda
- Family: Prosiphonidae
- Genus: Bathydomus; Thiele, 1912

Type species
- Bathydomus obtectus Thiele, 1912

Genus of gastropods

Bathydomus is a genus of sea snails, marine gastropod mollusks in the family Prosiphonidae, the true whelks.

== Species ==
Species within the genus Bathydomus include:

- Bathydomus calathiscus (R. B. Watson, 1882)
- Bathydomus obtecta Thiele, 1912
- Bathydomus setosa (R. B. Watson, 1882)

Synonyms

- Bathydomus longisetosus Castellanos & D. E. Fernández, 1972: synonym of Americominella duartei Klappenbach & Ureta, 1972
- Bathydomus obtectus Thiele, 1912: synonym of Bathydomus obtecta Thiele, 1912 (wrong gender agreement of specific epithet)
- Bathydomus thielei A. W. B. Powell, 1958: synonym of Antarctodomus thielei (A. W. B. Powell, 1958) (original combination)
