= Crenatosipho beaglensis =

Scientific classification
- Kingdom: Animalia
- Phylum: Mollusca
- Class: Gastropoda
- Subclass: Caenogastropoda
- Order: Neogastropoda
- Family: Prosiphonidae
- Genus: Crenatosipho
- Species: C. beaglensis

Binomial name
- Crenatosipho beaglensis Linse, 2002

Species of gastropod

Crenatosipho beaglensis is a species of sea snail, a marine gastropod mollusk in the family Prosiphonidae.
