= Proneptunea rossiana =

Scientific classification
- Kingdom: Animalia
- Phylum: Mollusca
- Class: Gastropoda
- Subclass: Caenogastropoda
- Order: Neogastropoda
- Family: Prosiphonidae
- Genus: Proneptunea
- Species: P. rossiana

Binomial name
- Proneptunea rossiana Dell, 1990

Species of gastropod

Proneptunea rossiana is a species of sea snail, a marine gastropod mollusk in the family Prosiphonidae, the true whelks.
