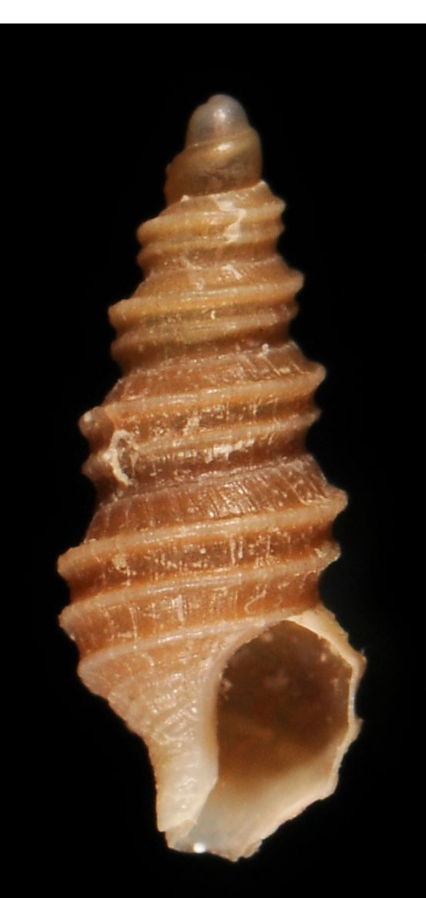
- Shell of Prosipho turritus (specimen at the Smithsonian Institution)

Scientific classification
- Kingdom: Animalia
- Phylum: Mollusca
- Class: Gastropoda
- Subclass: Caenogastropoda
- Order: Neogastropoda
- Family: Prosiphonidae
- Genus: Prosipho
- Species: P. turritus

Binomial name
- Prosipho turritus Oliver & Picken, 1984

= Prosipho turritus =

Species of gastropod

Prosipho turritus is a species of sea snail, a marine gastropod mollusk in the family Prosiphonidae, the true whelks.

== Distribution ==
This marine species occurs off Signy Island, the South Orkney Islands.
