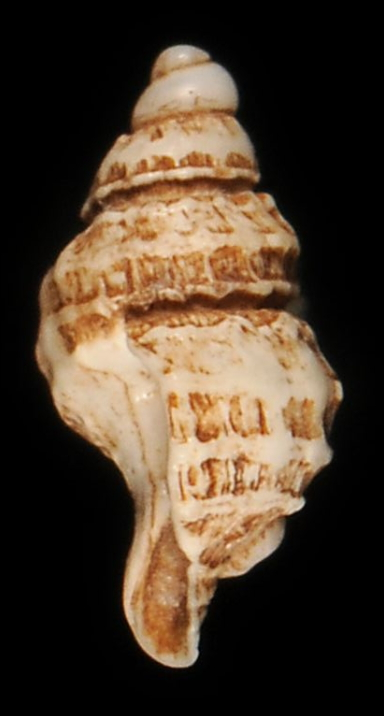
- Shell of Prosipho nodosus (specimen at the Smithsonian Institution)

Scientific classification
- Kingdom: Animalia
- Phylum: Mollusca
- Class: Gastropoda
- Subclass: Caenogastropoda
- Order: Neogastropoda
- Family: Prosiphonidae
- Genus: Prosipho
- Species: P. nodosus

Binomial name
- Prosipho nodosus Thiele, 1912

Synonyms
- Prosipho cancellatus E. A. Smith, 1915; Prosipho hunteri Hedley, 1916; Prosipho shiraseae Numanami, 1996

= Prosipho nodosus =

Species of gastropod

Prosipho nodosus is a species of sea snail, a marine gastropod mollusk in the family Prosiphonidae, the true whelks.

== Description ==
(Original description in German) The main characteristic of this species is the longitudinal ribs, which are primarily visible on the upper part of the whorls. At the points where these ribs intersect the spiral ridges, they make the topmost ridge—and sometimes the one below it—knobby.

The shell is barely 5.5 mm in height and 2.5 mm in diameter. Of its 4.5 whorls, the first 1.5 are smooth, flatly curved, and of moderate size. The following whorls have two strong spiral ridges. The suture lies above the third ridge, which is therefore only visible on the body whorl. The top of the whorls, beneath the suture, is significantly raised, but does not form a distinct ridge. The underside of the body whorl and the lower process are sometimes clearly sculpted with several ridges, which are indistinct on other shells. The aperture is a long oval, with a tube at the bottom that is more or less obliquely directed.

The radula is similar to that of Prosipho gracilis Thiele, 1912, but the outermost cusp of the lateral plate is smaller than the secondary cusp.

== Distribution ==
This species occurs in the Ross Sea, Antarctica.
