= Spikebuccinum stephaniae =

Scientific classification
- Kingdom: Animalia
- Phylum: Mollusca
- Class: Gastropoda
- Subclass: Caenogastropoda
- Order: Neogastropoda
- Family: Prosiphonidae
- Genus: Spikebuccinum
- Species: S. stephaniae

Binomial name
- Spikebuccinum stephaniae Harasewych & Kantor, 2004

Species of gastropod

Spikebuccinum stephaniae is a species of sea snail, a marine gastropod mollusk in the family Prosiphonidae.

== Distribution ==
This marine species occurs off South Georgia, South Atlantic Ocean.

== Bibliography ==
- Harasewych M.G. & Kantor Y.I. (2004) The deep-sea Buccinoidea (Gastropoda: Neogastropoda) of the Scotia Sea and adjacent abyssal plains and trenches. The Nautilus 118(1): 1–42
