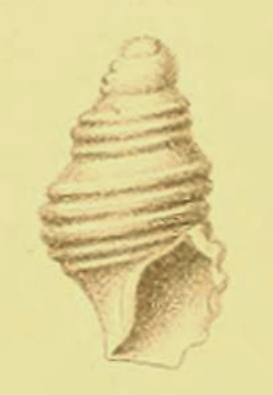
- Shell of Prosipho pupa (holotype)

Scientific classification
- Kingdom: Animalia
- Phylum: Mollusca
- Class: Gastropoda
- Subclass: Caenogastropoda
- Order: Neogastropoda
- Family: Prosiphonidae
- Genus: Prosipho
- Species: P. pupa

Binomial name
- Prosipho pupa Thiele, 1912

= Prosipho pupa =

Species of gastropod

Prosipho pupa is a species of sea snail, a marine gastropod mollusk in the family Prosiphonidae, the true whelks.

== Description ==
(Original description in German) This species is similar to Prosipho pusillus, but it has three ridges on the middle whorls instead of two and is also slightly different in shape.

The shell is 3.5 mm high and 2 mm wide, consisting of four whorls. The first 1.5 whorls are smooth, while the middle ones have the two ridges as mentioned. Two more are added to the underside of the body whorl. The siphonal canal is short, straight, and without ridges. The aperture is quite small with a wide, barely offset breathing tube.

== Distribution ==
This marine species occurs in the Scotia Sea, Antarctica.
