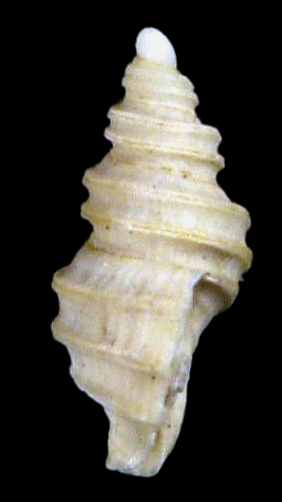
- Shell of Antistreptus contrarius (specimen at the Smithsonian Institution)

Scientific classification
- Kingdom: Animalia
- Phylum: Mollusca
- Class: Gastropoda
- Subclass: Caenogastropoda
- Order: Neogastropoda
- Family: Prosiphonidae
- Genus: Antistreptus
- Species: A. contrarius

Binomial name
- Antistreptus contrarius (Thiele, 1912)

Synonyms
- Prosipho contrarius Thiele, 1912

= Antistreptus contrarius =

Species of gastropod

Antistreptus contrarius is a species of sea snail, a marine gastropod mollusk in the family Prosiphonidae, the true whelks.

== Description ==
(Described in German as Prosipho contrarius ) Two damaged shells, collected from the Gauss Station, represent a sinistral coiling species. While it's a mirror image of Prosipho nodosus Thiele, 1912, it's notably more slender.

The larger specimen is 4.6 mm high and 2.3 mm wide and is composed of 4.5 whorls. The first whorl is smooth and pointed. The subsequent whorls are adorned with two or three sharp spiral ridges, depending on whether the suture lies on or below the lowest ridge. The whorls increase in size quite rapidly and are only slightly convex. The growth lines are dense and clearly visible. On the underside of the body whorl, two faint ridges are present.

The lower process is quite long and thin, sculpted with indistinct ridges in its upper portion. The aperture is a narrow oval and is clearly set apart from the siphonal canal.

== Distribution ==
This species occurs in Antarctic waters.
