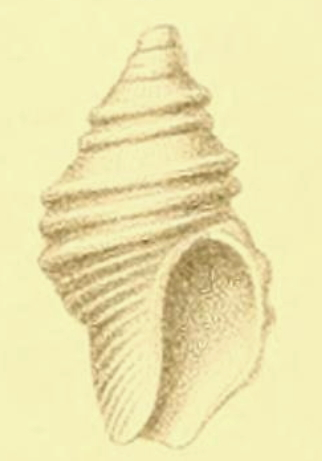
- Shell of Prosipho propinquus (holotype)

Scientific classification
- Kingdom: Animalia
- Phylum: Mollusca
- Class: Gastropoda
- Subclass: Caenogastropoda
- Order: Neogastropoda
- Family: Prosiphonidae
- Genus: Prosipho
- Species: P. propinquus

Binomial name
- Prosipho propinquus Thiele, 1912

= Prosipho propinquus =

Species of gastropod

Prosipho propinquus is a species of sea snail, a marine gastropod mollusk in the family Prosiphonidae, the true whelks.

== Description ==
(Original description in German) This shell is 4.5 mm high and 2.3 mm wide, and is composed of 4.5 whorls. The middle two whorls have prominent ridges, while the final, largest whorl is decorated with three strong ridges and three weaker ones underneath. The shell also features a straight, relatively long and wide siphonal canal that has its own set of ridges. The aperture of the shell is quite large and oval-shaped, transitioning smoothly into a slanted breathing tube.
