= Falsitromina abyssorum =

Scientific classification
- Kingdom: Animalia
- Phylum: Mollusca
- Class: Gastropoda
- Subclass: Caenogastropoda
- Order: Neogastropoda
- Family: Prosiphonidae
- Genus: Falsitromina
- Species: F. abyssorum

Binomial name
- Falsitromina abyssorum (Lus, 1993)

Synonyms
- Lusitromina abyssorum (Lus, 1993) superseded combination; Tacita abyssorum Lus, 1993; Tromina abyssorum Lus, 1993

Species of gastropod

Falsitromina abyssorum is a species of sea snail, a marine gastropod mollusk in the family Prosiphonidae.
