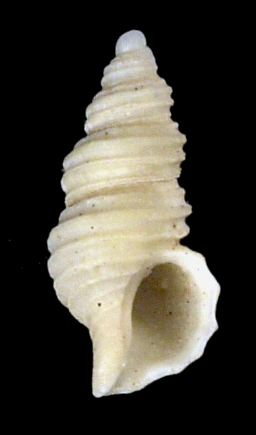
- Shell of Prosipho glacialis (specimen at the Smithsonian Institution)

Scientific classification
- Kingdom: Animalia
- Phylum: Mollusca
- Class: Gastropoda
- Subclass: Caenogastropoda
- Order: Neogastropoda
- Family: Prosiphonidae
- Genus: Prosipho
- Species: P. glacialis

Binomial name
- Prosipho glacialis Thiele, 1912

Synonyms
- Prosipho priestleyi (Hedley, 1916); Trophon priestleyi Hedley, 1916 ·

= Prosipho glacialis =

Species of gastropod

Prosipho glacialis is a species of sea snail, a marine gastropod mollusk in the family Prosiphonidae, the true whelks.

== Description ==
(Original description in German) This small species is distinguished by its peculiar extended initial whorl and its slightly less turreted shape. It is about 5 mm in height and 2.25 mm in diameter. It has five whorls, the first of which is smooth and projects irregularly. The following whorls are moderately convex and have two or three strong spiral ridges, depending on whether the suture is a bit higher or lower. On the underside of the body whorl, one ridge is usually distinct, and a few weaker ones may also be visible.

The columella is straight and moderately long. The aperture is elongated, egg-shaped, with a slightly oblique siphonal canal. The fresh shell is translucent whitish, without a noticeable periostracum.

The radula has a fairly long and narrow central plate that widens towards the front, with three rather equally sized denticles. The lateral plates have three-pronged cutting edges; the innermost prong is quite large and a little longer than it is wide, while the other two are close together, with only their tips separated, the outer one being larger.

== Distribution ==
This species occurs in the Ross Sea, Antarctica;
