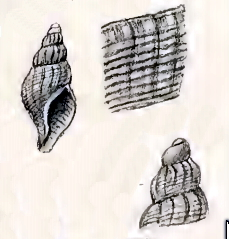
- Original image of a shell of Falsimohnia fulvicans

Scientific classification
- Kingdom: Animalia
- Phylum: Mollusca
- Class: Gastropoda
- Subclass: Caenogastropoda
- Order: Neogastropoda
- Superfamily: Buccinoidea
- Family: Prosiphonidae
- Genus: Falsimohnia
- Species: F. fulvicans

Binomial name
- Falsimohnia fulvicans (Strebel, 1908)

Synonyms
- Bela fulvicans Strebel, 1908 (original combination); Mangelia fulvicans (Strebel, 1908)

= Falsimohnia fulvicans =

Species of gastropod

Falsimohnia fulvicans is a species of sea snail, a marine gastropod mollusk in the family Prosiphonidae.

== Description ==
The length of the shell attains 8.2 mm, its diameter 4.6 mm.

== Distribution ==
This marine species occurs off Southern Argentina and South Georgia.
