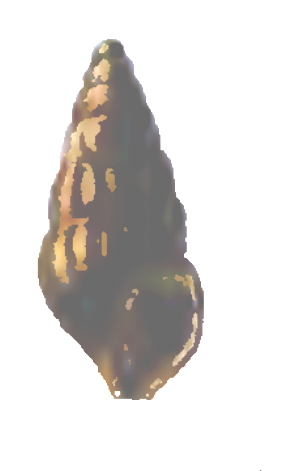
- Original image of a shell of Savatieria coppingeri

Scientific classification
- Kingdom: Animalia
- Phylum: Mollusca
- Class: Gastropoda
- Subclass: Caenogastropoda
- Order: Neogastropoda
- Superfamily: Buccinoidea
- Family: Prosiphonidae
- Genus: Savatieria
- Species: S. coppingeri

Binomial name
- Savatieria coppingeri (E. A. Smith, 1881)

Synonyms
- Mangelia coppingeri (E.A. Smith, 1881); Pleurotoma (Mangelia) coppingeri E. A. Smith, 1881; Pleurotoma (Mangilia) coppingeri E. A. Smith, 1881 (original combination); Pleurotoma coppingeri E. A. Smith, 1881 ·; Savatieria (Lisosavatieria) deseadense Castellanos & D. Fernández, 1975; Savatieria deseadensis Castellanos & Fernandez, 1975 ·; Savatieria pfefferi Strebel, 1905

= Savatieria coppingeri =

Species of gastropod

Savatieria coppingeri is a species of sea snail, a marine gastropod mollusk in the family Prosiphonidae.

== Description ==
The length of the shell attains 6⅓ mm, its diameter 2⅓ mm.

(Original description) The small shell has an elongate and subfusiform shape. It is dark purplish brown, paler at the apex. It contains 6½ whorls, divided by a deep suture; the first 1½ forming the protoconch, large, semiglobose and smooth. The rest are slightly convex and longitudinally ribbed. The ribs are stout, broader than the interstices, suberect, a little arcuated. Those on the body whorl become obsolete a trifle below the middle, whence downward the whorl is transversely finely striated, the striae at the extremity being closer together than those above. The aperture is small, ovate, occupying about one third of the entire length. The columella is arcuate, covered with a thin callosity. The outer lip is thickened, with a very faint sinus a little below the suture. The siphonal canal is short, distinct and oblique.

== Distribution ==
This marine species occurs off Patagonia, Chile
