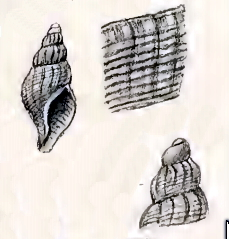
- Shell of Falsimohnia fulvicans

Scientific classification
- Kingdom: Animalia
- Phylum: Mollusca
- Class: Gastropoda
- Subclass: Caenogastropoda
- Order: Neogastropoda
- Superfamily: Buccinoidea
- Family: Prosiphonidae
- Genus: Falsimohnia; Powell, 1951

Type species
- Buccinum albozonatum Watson, 1886

Species
- See text

= Falsimohnia =

Genus of gastropods

Falsimohnia is a genus of sea snails, marine gastropod mollusks in the family Prosiphonidae, the true whelks.

== Species ==
Species within the genus Falsimohnia include:

- Falsimohnia albozonata (Watson, 1886)
- Falsimohnia anderssoni (Strebel, 1908)
- Falsimohnia fulvicans (Strebel, 1908)
- Falsimohnia hoshiaii (Numanami, 1996)
- Falsimohnia innocens (E. A. Smith, 1907)
- Falsimohnia minor (Strebel, 1908)
- Falsimohnia plicatula (Thiele, 1912)

Synonyms

- Falsimohnia davisi Egorova, 1972: synonym of Falsimohnia innocens (E. A. Smith, 1907) (junior subjective synonym)
- Falsimohnia okutanii (Numanami, 1996): synonym of Falsitromina okutanii (Numanami, 1996)
