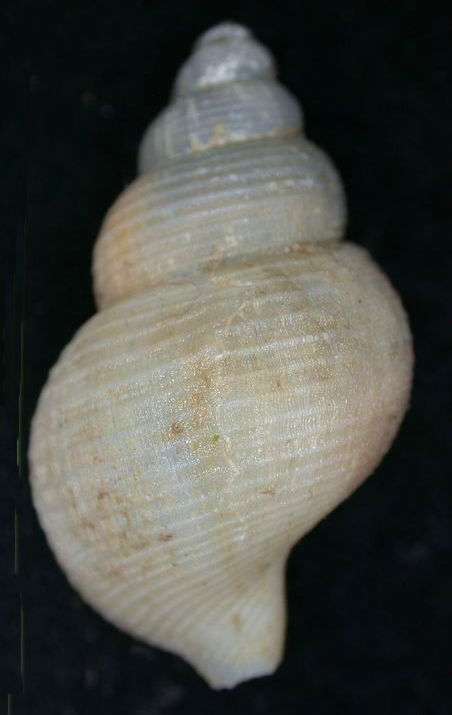
- Shell of Antarctodomus powelli

Scientific classification
- Kingdom: Animalia
- Phylum: Mollusca
- Class: Gastropoda
- Subclass: Caenogastropoda
- Order: Neogastropoda
- Family: Prosiphonidae
- Genus: Antarctodomus
- Species: A. powelli

Binomial name
- Antarctodomus powelli (Dell, 1995)

= Antarctodomus powelli =

Species of gastropod

Antarctodomus powelli is a species of marine gastropod mollusk (sea snail) belonging to the family Prosiphonidae, commonly referred to as true whelks.

== Description and distribution ==
This marine species occurs in the Hikurangi Trough and Bounty Trough off New Zealand at depths between 1373 metres-2602 meteres, and also off Tasmania, Australia. Its shell typically attains a length of 34 millimetres and a diameter of 20 millimetres.
