= Drepanodontus tatyanae =

Scientific classification
- Kingdom: Animalia
- Phylum: Mollusca
- Class: Gastropoda
- Subclass: Caenogastropoda
- Order: Neogastropoda
- Family: Prosiphonidae
- Genus: Drepanodontus
- Species: D. tatyanae

Binomial name
- Drepanodontus tatyanae Harasewych & Kantor, 2004

Species of gastropod

Drepanodontus tatyanae is a species of sea snail, a marine gastropod mollusk in the family Prosiphonidae.

== Behavior and Life Cycle ==
The species is demersal, living close to the sea bed. They are broadcast spawners. Drepandodontus tatyanae grow from embryos to trochophores to veligers before maturing into adults.

== Distribution ==
This species occurs in the Scotia Sea, South Atlantic.
