= Bathydomus obtecta =

Scientific classification
- Kingdom: Animalia
- Phylum: Mollusca
- Class: Gastropoda
- Subclass: Caenogastropoda
- Order: Neogastropoda
- Family: Prosiphonidae
- Genus: Bathydomus
- Species: B. obtecta

Binomial name
- Bathydomus obtecta Thiele, 1912

Synonyms
- Bathydomus obtectus

Species of gastropod

Bathydomus obtecta is a species of sea snail, a marine gastropod mollusk in the family Prosiphonidae, the true whelks.
