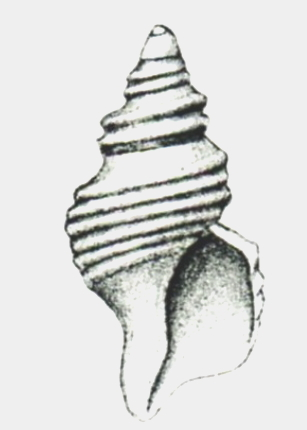
- Shell of Prosipho valdiviae (holotype)

Scientific classification
- Kingdom: Animalia
- Phylum: Mollusca
- Class: Gastropoda
- Subclass: Caenogastropoda
- Order: Neogastropoda
- Family: Prosiphonidae
- Genus: Prosipho
- Species: P. valdiviae

Binomial name
- Prosipho valdiviae Thiele, 1925

= Prosipho valdiviae =

Species of gastropod

Prosipho valdiviae is a species of sea snail, a marine gastropod mollusk in the family Prosiphonidae, the true whelks.

== Distribution ==
This species occurs off the Kerguelen Islands and the Crozet Islands.
