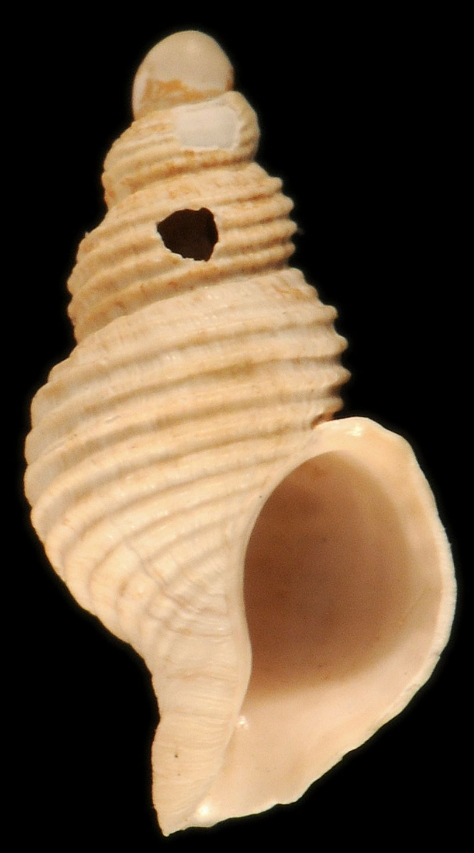
- Shell of Prosipho spiralis (specimen at the Smithsonian Institution)

Scientific classification
- Kingdom: Animalia
- Phylum: Mollusca
- Class: Gastropoda
- Subclass: Caenogastropoda
- Order: Neogastropoda
- Family: Prosiphonidae
- Genus: Prosipho
- Species: P. spiralis

Binomial name
- Prosipho spiralis Thiele, 1912

= Prosipho spiralis =

Species of gastropod

Prosipho spiralis is a species of sea snail, a marine gastropod mollusk in the family Prosiphonidae, the true whelks.

== Description ==
(Original description in German) This shell is easily identified by its unique apex, which appears to have been cut off at the top. The specimen is 7.5 mm high and 3.75 mm in diameter, composed of 4.5 whorls.

The first 1.5 embryonic whorls are smooth and have relatively straight sides. The following whorls begin with three spiral ridges, with more being added later. The underside of the body whorl is well-rounded and slightly bulging, also featuring distinct spiral ridges. In total, there are 10 ridges on the body whorl.

The aperture is a large, egg shape that transitions smoothly into the lower, slightly oblique siphonal canal.

== Distribution ==
This species occurs in the Davis Sea and also off Roosevelt Island, Ross Sea, Antarctica.
