= Prosipho harrietae =

Scientific classification
- Kingdom: Animalia
- Phylum: Mollusca
- Class: Gastropoda
- Subclass: Caenogastropoda
- Order: Neogastropoda
- Family: Prosiphonidae
- Genus: Prosipho
- Species: P. harrietae

Binomial name
- Prosipho harrietae Engl & Schwabe, 2003

Species of gastropod

Prosipho harrietae is a species of sea snail, a marine gastropod mollusk in the family Prosiphonidae, the true whelks.

== Distribution ==
This species occurs in Antarctic waters.
