= Chlanificula thielei =

Scientific classification
- Kingdom: Animalia
- Phylum: Mollusca
- Class: Gastropoda
- Subclass: Caenogastropoda
- Order: Neogastropoda
- Family: Prosiphonidae
- Genus: Chlanificula
- Species: C. thielei

Binomial name
- Chlanificula thielei Powell, 1958

Species of gastropod

Chlanificula thielei is a species of sea snail, a marine gastropod mollusk in the family Prosiphonidae, the true whelks.
