= Proneptunea rufa =

Scientific classification
- Kingdom: Animalia
- Phylum: Mollusca
- Class: Gastropoda
- Subclass: Caenogastropoda
- Order: Neogastropoda
- Family: Prosiphonidae
- Genus: Proneptunea
- Species: P. rufa

Binomial name
- Proneptunea rufa Oliver & Picken, 1984

Species of gastropod

Proneptunea rufa is a species of sea snail, a marine gastropod mollusk in the family Prosiphonidae, the true whelks.

== Distribution ==
This marine species occurs off King George Island, Antarctica.
