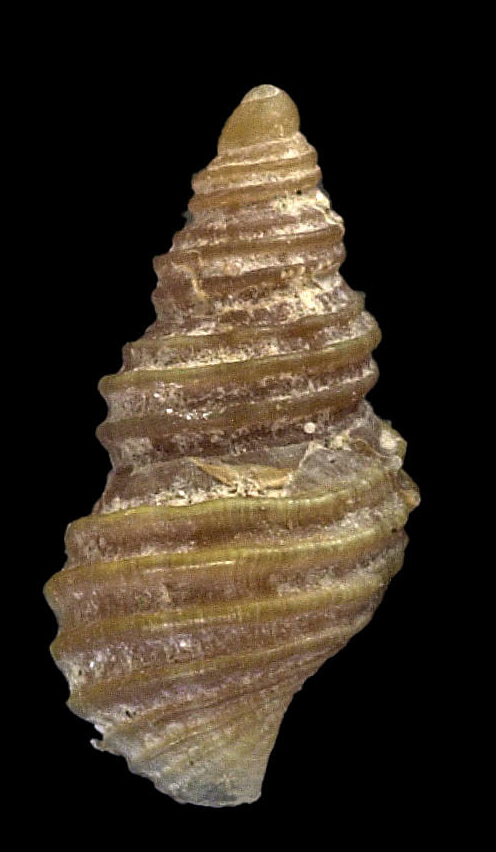
- Shell of Prosipho astrolabiensis (specimen at the Smithsonian Institution)

Scientific classification
- Kingdom: Animalia
- Phylum: Mollusca
- Class: Gastropoda
- Subclass: Caenogastropoda
- Order: Neogastropoda
- Family: Prosiphonidae
- Genus: Prosipho
- Species: P. astrolabiensis

Binomial name
- Prosipho astrolabiensis Strebel, 1908

Synonyms
- Sipho astrolabiensis Strebel, 1908

= Prosipho astrolabiensis =

Species of gastropod

Prosipho astrolabiensis is a species of sea snail, a marine gastropod mollusk in the family Prosiphonidae, the true whelks.

== Description ==
(Original description in German) This thin, yet solid, turreted shell is white and covered in a light yellowish, horn-colored cuticle that appears compressed in the grooves between the ridges. The 5.5 convex whorls are separated by a relatively deep suture. The body whorl is constricted at the base and terminates in a short, broad, oblique, and slightly bent-back siphonal canal.

The columella is somewhat curved and obliquely truncated at the bottom. The columellar callus is notable because the spiral ridges suddenly stop there, which may be due to resorption. The shell's growth direction is nearly vertical.

The first 1.75 whorls are quite smooth. After that, four spiral ridges abruptly emerge and become progressively stronger. The lowest of these ridges, which is already weakening, is positioned just above the suture. On the body whorl, a new, faint ridge appears below the suture, and five additional ridges of decreasing strength are added to the existing four. These ridges are swollen, as they create corresponding indentations inside the aperture.

== Distribution ==
This species occurs off Petermann Island, Antarctica, Antarctic Ocean.
