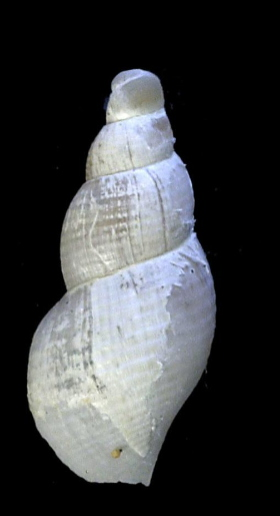
- Shell of Falsimohnia innocens

Scientific classification
- Kingdom: Animalia
- Phylum: Mollusca
- Class: Gastropoda
- Subclass: Caenogastropoda
- Order: Neogastropoda
- Family: Prosiphonidae
- Genus: Falsimohnia
- Species: F. innocens

Binomial name
- Falsimohnia innocens (Smith, 1907)

Synonyms
- Falsimohnia davisi Egorova, 1972 ·; Pareuthria innocens (E. A. Smith, 1907); Thesbia innocens E. A. Smith, 1907 (original combination)

= Falsimohnia innocens =

Species of gastropod

Falsimohnia innocens is a species of sea snail, a marine gastropod mollusc in the family Prosiphonidae, the true whelks.

== Distribution ==
This species occurs in the Ross Sea.
