= Meteuthria futilis =

Scientific classification
- Kingdom: Animalia
- Phylum: Mollusca
- Class: Gastropoda
- Subclass: Caenogastropoda
- Order: Neogastropoda
- Family: Prosiphonidae
- Genus: Meteuthria
- Species: M. futilis

Binomial name
- Meteuthria futilis (Watson, 1882)

Synonyms
- Fusus (Neptunea) futile R. B. Watson, 1882 superseded combination

Species of gastropod

Meteuthria futilis is a species of sea snail, a marine gastropod mollusk in the family Prosiphonidae, the true whelks.
