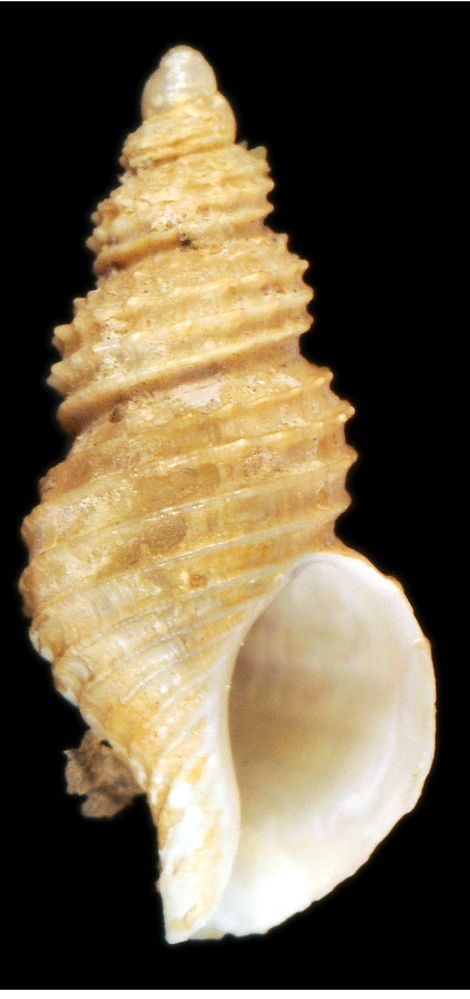
- Shell of Prosipho mundus (specimen at the Smithsonian Institution)

Scientific classification
- Kingdom: Animalia
- Phylum: Mollusca
- Class: Gastropoda
- Subclass: Caenogastropoda
- Order: Neogastropoda
- Family: Prosiphonidae
- Genus: Prosipho
- Species: P. mundus

Binomial name
- Prosipho mundus E.A. Smith, 1915

Synonyms
- Prosipho macleani Hedley, 1916; Prosipho madigani Hedley, 1916 (superseded combination); Prosipho mundus var. macleani Hedley, 1916 (junior subjective synonym)

= Prosipho mundus =

Species of gastropod

Prosipho mundus is a species of sea snail, a marine gastropod mollusk in the family Prosiphonidae, the true whelks.

== Description ==
The length of the shell attains 7.5 mm, its diameter 3.5 mm.

(Original description) The shell is shortly fusiform and has a dirty whitish color. It is composed of 5.5 whorls.

The first 1.5 whorls are smooth and convex, forming a rounded, nipple-like apex. The next three whorls have four spiral lirae (ridges), while the body whorl has thirteen. The two or three uppermost lirae on the body whorl, like those on the spire, are finely nodular where they are crossed by approximately twenty longitudinal threads on the penultimate whorl. The entire surface is covered with fine growth lines.

The aperture is pear-shaped and smooth and white inside, measuring less than half the length of the shell. The columella is arched at the top and oblique at the bottom, and the anterior canal is moderately broad, oblique, and slightly curved back.

== Distribution ==
This marine species occurs in the McMurdo Sound, Antarctica.
