= Falsitromina tricarinata =

Scientific classification
- Kingdom: Animalia
- Phylum: Mollusca
- Class: Gastropoda
- Subclass: Caenogastropoda
- Order: Neogastropoda
- Family: Prosiphonidae
- Genus: Falsitromina
- Species: F. tricarinata

Binomial name
- Falsitromina tricarinata (Powell, 1951)

Species of gastropod

Falsitromina tricarinata is a species of sea snail, a marine gastropod mollusc in the family Prosiphonidae.
