= Neobuccinum =

Scientific classification
- Kingdom: Animalia
- Phylum: Mollusca
- Class: Gastropoda
- Subclass: Caenogastropoda
- Order: Neogastropoda
- Family: Prosiphonidae
- Genus: Neobuccinum; E. A. Smith, 1879

Type species
- Buccinopsis eatoni E. A. Smith, 1875

Genus of gastropods

Neobuccinum is a genus of sea snails, marine gastropod mollusks in the family Prosiphonidae, the true whelks.

== Characteristics ==
(Original description) The shell is bucciniform (shaped like a whelk). The wide siphonal canal is short. The operculum is somewhat oval and has a single spiral (the nucleus is barely terminal). At the margin near the nucleus it is slightly curved, concentrically striated with curved lines of growth.

== Species ==
Species within the genus Neobuccinum include:

- Neobuccinum eatoni E.A. Smith, 1875

Synonyms

- Neobuccinum praeclarum Strebel, 1908: synonym of Neobuccinum eatoni (E. A. Smith, 1875)
- Neobuccinum tenerum E. A. Smith, 1907: synonym of Probuccinum tenerum (E. A. Smith, 1907) (original combination)
