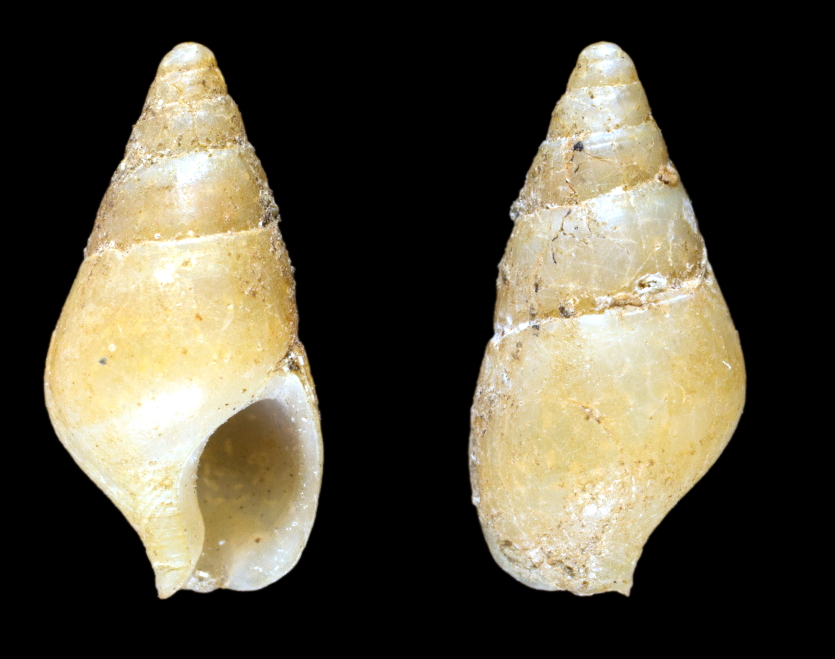
- Shell of Argeneuthria cerealis (syntype at MNHN, Paris)

Scientific classification
- Kingdom: Animalia
- Phylum: Mollusca
- Class: Gastropoda
- Subclass: Caenogastropoda
- Order: Neogastropoda
- Superfamily: Buccinoidea
- Family: Prosiphonidae
- Genus: Argeneuthria; Pastorino, 2016

Type species
- Euthria cerealis Rochebrune & Mabille, 1885

Species
- See text

= Argeneuthria =

Genus of gastropods

Argeneuthria is a genus of sea snails, marine gastropod mollusks in the family Prosiphonidae, the true whelks.

== Species ==
Species within the genus Argeneuthria include:

- Argeneuthria cerealis (Rochebrune & Mabille, 1885)
- Argeneuthria euthrioides (Melvill & Standen, 1898)
- Argeneuthria paessleri (Strebel, 1905)
- Argeneuthria philippii (Strebel, 1905)
- Argeneuthria varicosa Pastorino, 2016
