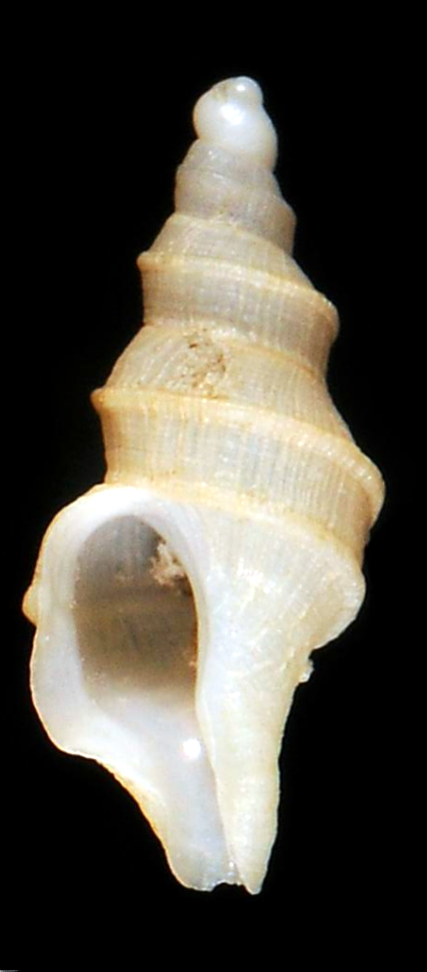
- Shell of Antistreptus reversus (specimen at the Smithsonian Institution)

Scientific classification
- Kingdom: Animalia
- Phylum: Mollusca
- Class: Gastropoda
- Subclass: Caenogastropoda
- Order: Neogastropoda
- Family: Prosiphonidae
- Genus: Antistreptus
- Species: A. reversus

Binomial name
- Antistreptus reversus (A.W.B. Powell, 1958)

Synonyms
- Prosipho reversus A. W. B. Powell, 1958 (original combination)

= Antistreptus reversus =

Species of gastropod

Antistreptus reversus is a species of sea snail, a marine gastropod mollusk in the family Prosiphonidae, the true whelks.

== Distribution ==
This species occurs in the Antarctic Ocean.
