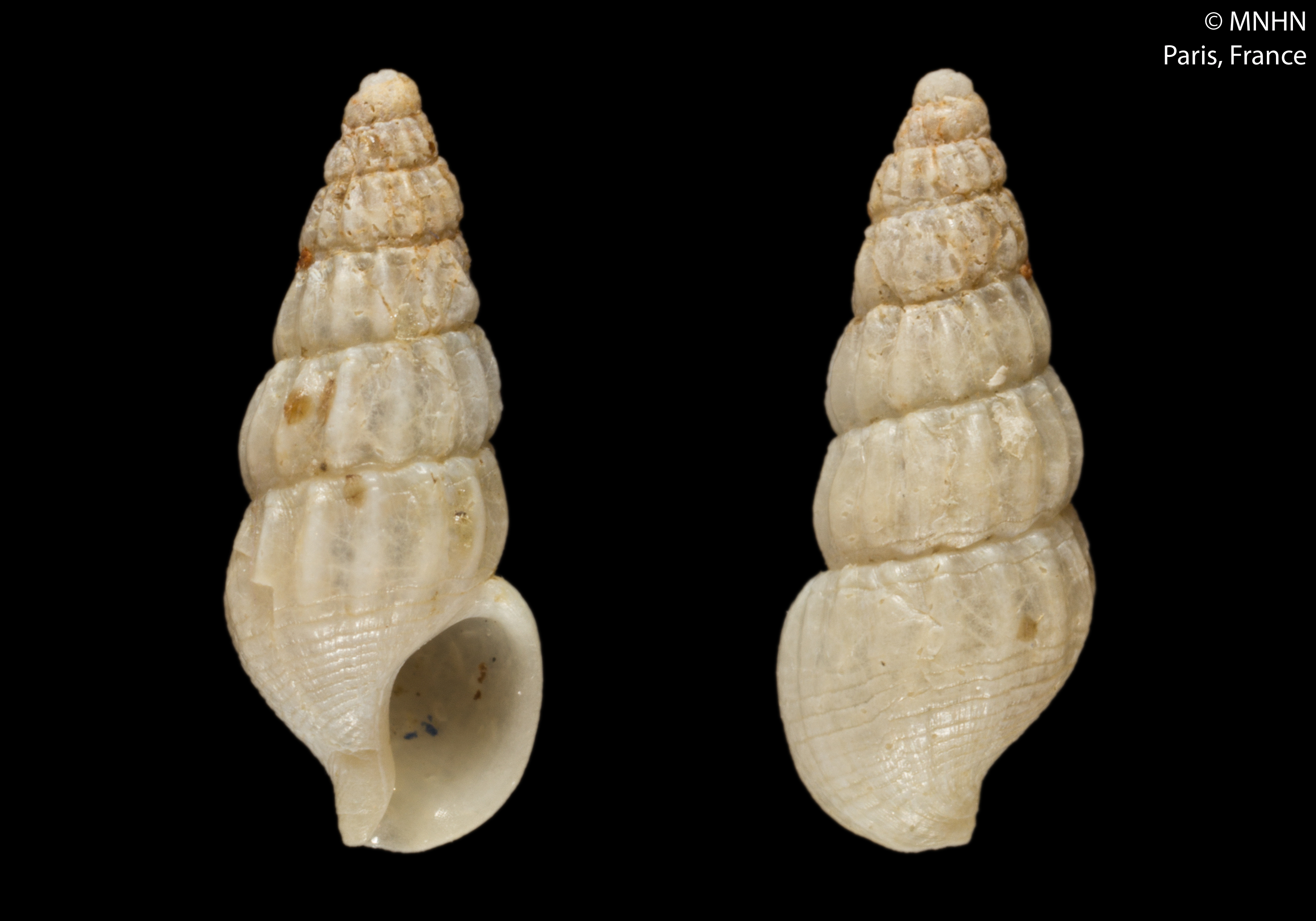
- Shell of Savatieria frigida (syntype at MNHN, Paris)

Scientific classification
- Kingdom: Animalia
- Phylum: Mollusca
- Class: Gastropoda
- Subclass: Caenogastropoda
- Order: Neogastropoda
- Superfamily: Buccinoidea
- Family: Prosiphonidae
- Genus: Savatieria; Rochebrune & Mabille, 1885

Type species
- Savatieria frigida Rochebrune & Mabille, 1885

Species
- See text

Synonyms
- Savatieria (Lisosavatieria) Castellanos & Fernandez, 1975; Savatieria (Savatieria) Rochebrune & Mabille, 1885

= Savatieria =

Genus of gastropods

Savatieria is a genus of sea snails, marine gastropod mollusks in the family Prosiphonidae.

== Species ==
Species within the genus Savatieria include:

- Savatieria areolata Strebel, 1905
- Savatieria bertrandi Melvill & Standen, 1914
- Savatieria chordata Castellanos, Rolán & Bartolotta, 1987
- Savatieria coppingeri (E. A. Smith, 1881)
- Savatieria frigida Rochebrune & Mabille, 1885
- Savatieria meridionalis (E. A. Smith, 1881)

Species brought into synonymy

- Savatieria concinna Melvill & Standen, 1912: synonym of Savatieria areolata Strebel, 1905
- Savatieria dubia Strebel, 1905: synonym of Savatieria frigida Rochebrune & Mabille, 1885
- Savatieria deseadensis Castellanos & Fernandez, 1975: synonym of Savatieria coppingeri (E. A. Smith, 1881)
- Savatieria molinae Strebel, 1905: synonym of Savatieria meridionalis (E. A. Smith, 1881)
- Savatieria pfefferi Strebel, 1905: synonym of Savatieria frigida Rochebrune & Mabille, 1885: synonym of Savatieria coppingeri (E. A. Smith, 1881)
