= Antistreptus perversus =

Scientific classification
- Kingdom: Animalia
- Phylum: Mollusca
- Class: Gastropoda
- Subclass: Caenogastropoda
- Order: Neogastropoda
- Family: Prosiphonidae
- Genus: Antistreptus
- Species: A. perversus

Binomial name
- Antistreptus perversus (A. W. B. Powell, 1951)

Synonyms
- Prosipho perversus A. W. B. Powell, 1951

Species of gastropod

Antistreptus perversus is a species of sea snail, a marine gastropod mollusk in the family Prosiphonidae, the true whelks.
