= Chlanificula =

Scientific classification
- Kingdom: Animalia
- Phylum: Mollusca
- Class: Gastropoda
- Subclass: Caenogastropoda
- Order: Neogastropoda
- Family: Prosiphonidae
- Genus: Chlanificula; Powell, 1958

Type species
- Chlanificula thielei A. W. B. Powell, 1958

Genus of gastropods

Chlanificula is a genus of sea snails, marine gastropod mollusks in the family Prosiphonidae, the true whelks.

== Species ==
Species within the genus Chlanificula include:

- Chlanificula thielei Powell, 1958
