= Drepanodontus =

Scientific classification
- Kingdom: Animalia
- Phylum: Mollusca
- Class: Gastropoda
- Subclass: Caenogastropoda
- Order: Neogastropoda
- Family: Prosiphonidae
- Genus: Drepanodontus; Harasewych & Kantor, 2004

Genus of gastropods

Drepanodontus is a genus of sea snails, marine gastropod mollusks in the family Prosiphonidae.

== Species ==
Species within the genus Drepanodontus include:

- Drepanodontus peonza Pastorino, 2021
- Drepanodontus tatyanae Harasewych & Kantor, 2004
