= Muffinbuccinum =

Scientific classification
- Kingdom: Animalia
- Phylum: Mollusca
- Class: Gastropoda
- Subclass: Caenogastropoda
- Order: Neogastropoda
- Family: Prosiphonidae
- Genus: Muffinbuccinum; Harasewych & Kantor, 2004

Type species
- Muffinbuccinum catherinae Harasewych & Kantor, 2004

Genus of gastropods

Muffinbuccinum is a genus of sea snails, marine gastropod mollusks in the family Prosiphonidae.

== Species ==
Species within the genus Muffinbuccinum include:

- Muffinbuccinum catherinae Harasewych & Kantor, 2004
