= Muffinbuccinum catherinae =

Scientific classification
- Kingdom: Animalia
- Phylum: Mollusca
- Class: Gastropoda
- Subclass: Caenogastropoda
- Order: Neogastropoda
- Family: Prosiphonidae
- Genus: Muffinbuccinum
- Species: M. catherinae

Binomial name
- Muffinbuccinum catherinae Harasewych & Kantor, 2004

Species of gastropod

Muffinbuccinum catherinae is a species of sea snail, a marine gastropod mollusk in the family Prosiphonidae.
