= Proneptunea =

Scientific classification
- Kingdom: Animalia
- Phylum: Mollusca
- Class: Gastropoda
- Subclass: Caenogastropoda
- Order: Neogastropoda
- Family: Prosiphonidae
- Genus: Proneptunea; Thiele, 1912

Genus of gastropods

Proneptunea is a genus of sea snails, marine gastropod mollusks in the family Prosiphonidae, the true whelks.

== Species ==
Species within the genus Proneptunea include:

- Proneptunea amabilis Thiele, 1912
- Proneptunea duplicarinata A. W. B. Powell, 1951
- Proneptunea fenestrata A. W. B. Powell, 1951
- Proneptunea minuta Castellanos, 1992
- Proneptunea rossiana Dell, 1990
- Proneptunea rufa Oliver & Picken, 1984
- Proneptunea subfenestra Oliver & Picken, 1984
