= Falsitromina =

Scientific classification
- Kingdom: Animalia
- Phylum: Mollusca
- Class: Gastropoda
- Subclass: Caenogastropoda
- Order: Neogastropoda
- Family: Prosiphonidae
- Genus: Falsitromina; Dell, 1990

Type species
- Tromina bella Powell, 1951

Synonyms
- Lusitromina Harasewych & Kantor, 2004 junior subjective synonym

Genus of gastropods

Falsitromina is a genus of sea snails, marine gastropod molluscs in the family Prosiphonidae.

== Species ==
Species within the genus Falsitromina include:

- Falsitromina abyssicola (A. H. Clarke, 1961)
- Falsitromina abyssorum (Lus, 1993)
- Falsitromina bella (Powell, 1951)
- Falsitromina elongata Kantor, Molodtsova, Zvonareva & Fedosov, 2023
- Falsitromina fenestrata (Powell, 1951)
- Falsitromina harasewychi Kantor, Molodtsova, Zvonareva & Fedosov, 2023
- Falsitromina okutanii (Numanami, 1996)
- Falsitromina powelli Dell, 1990
- Falsitromina simplex (Powell, 1951)
- Falsitromina tricarinata (Powell, 1951)
