= Chlanidotella modesta =

Scientific classification
- Kingdom: Animalia
- Phylum: Mollusca
- Class: Gastropoda
- Subclass: Caenogastropoda
- Order: Neogastropoda
- Family: Prosiphonidae
- Genus: Chlanidotella
- Species: C. modesta

Binomial name
- Chlanidotella modesta (E. von Martens, 1885)

Synonyms
- Chlanidota modesta (E. von Martens, 1885) superseded combination; Cominella modesta E. von Martens, 1885 superseded combination; Cominella modesta f. elongata Pfeffer, 1886; Cominella modesta f. undata Pfeffer, 1886 unaccepted; Thalassoplanes modesta (E. von Martens, 1885) superseded combination

Species of gastropod

Chlanidotella modesta is a species of sea snail, a marine gastropod mollusk in the family Prosiphonidae, the true whelks.

== Description ==
The length of the shell attains 13 mm, its diameter 7 mm.

(Original description in Latin) The shell is elongated-ovate. It is sculpted with obtuse, distant spiral ridges. It is thin, white, and covered by a pale greenish-yellow, vertically lamellose periostracum. There are five whorls, which are slightly flattened superiorly before becoming angled. The ovate aperture exceeds half the shell's length. It is white internally, and acutely pointed at the top. The outer margin is obtuse and slightly expanded, while the columellar margin is gently twisted, flattened, and somewhat abraded.

== Distribution ==
This marine species occurs off South Georgia.
