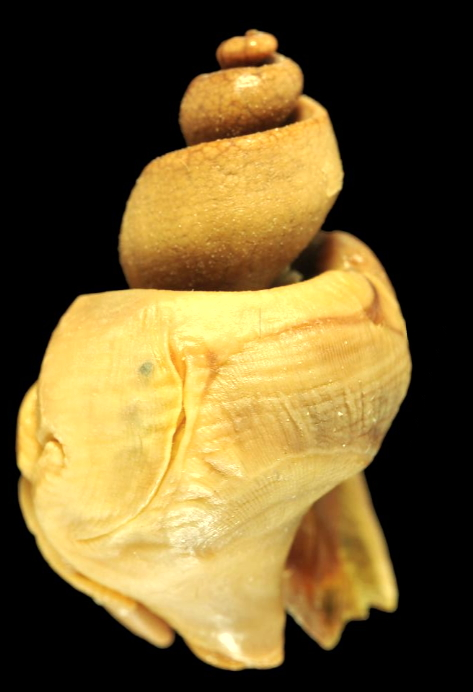
- Shell of Antarctodomus thielei (specimen at the Smithsonian Institution)

Scientific classification
- Kingdom: Animalia
- Phylum: Mollusca
- Class: Gastropoda
- Subclass: Caenogastropoda
- Order: Neogastropoda
- Family: Prosiphonidae
- Genus: Antarctodomus
- Species: A. thielei

Binomial name
- Antarctodomus thielei (Powell, 1958)

Synonyms
- Bathydomus thielei A. W. B. Powell, 1958 (original combination); Parancistrolepis (Antarctodomus) thielei A. W. B. Powell, 1958

= Antarctodomus thielei =

Species of gastropod

Antarctodomus thielei is a species of sea snail, a marine gastropod mollusk in the family Prosiphonidae, the true whelks.

== Distribution ==
This marine species occurs in the Ross Sea, Antarctica at depths between 565 m and 569 m.
