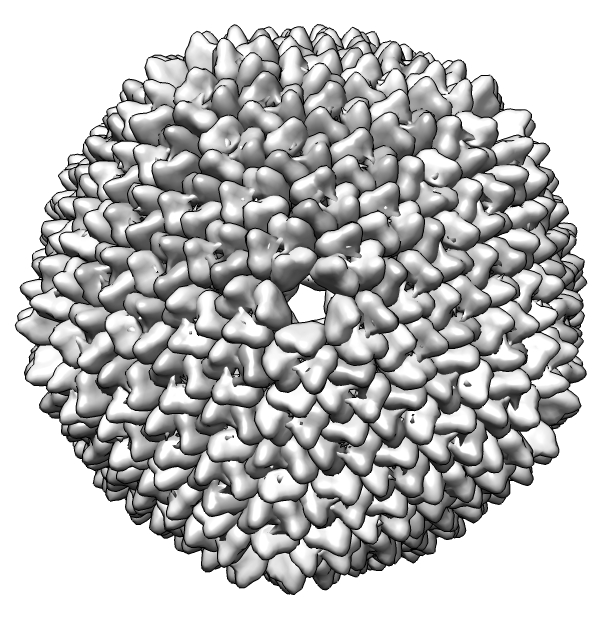
- CryoEM model of Enterobacteria phage PRD1 capsid. PDB entry 1gw7

Virus classification
- (unranked): Virus
- Realm: Varidnaviria
- Kingdom: Bamfordvirae
- Phylum: Preplasmiviricota
- Subphylum: Prepoliviricotina
- Class: Tectiliviricetes
- Order: Kalamavirales
- Family: Tectiviridae

Genera
- See text

= Tectivirus =

Tectiviridae

Family of viruses

Tectiviridae is a family of viruses with 12 species in five genera. Bacteria serve as natural hosts. Tectiviruses have no head-tail structure, but are capable of producing tail-like tubes of ~ 60×10 nm upon adsorption or after chloroform treatment. The name is derived from Latin tectus (meaning 'covered').

== Virology ==
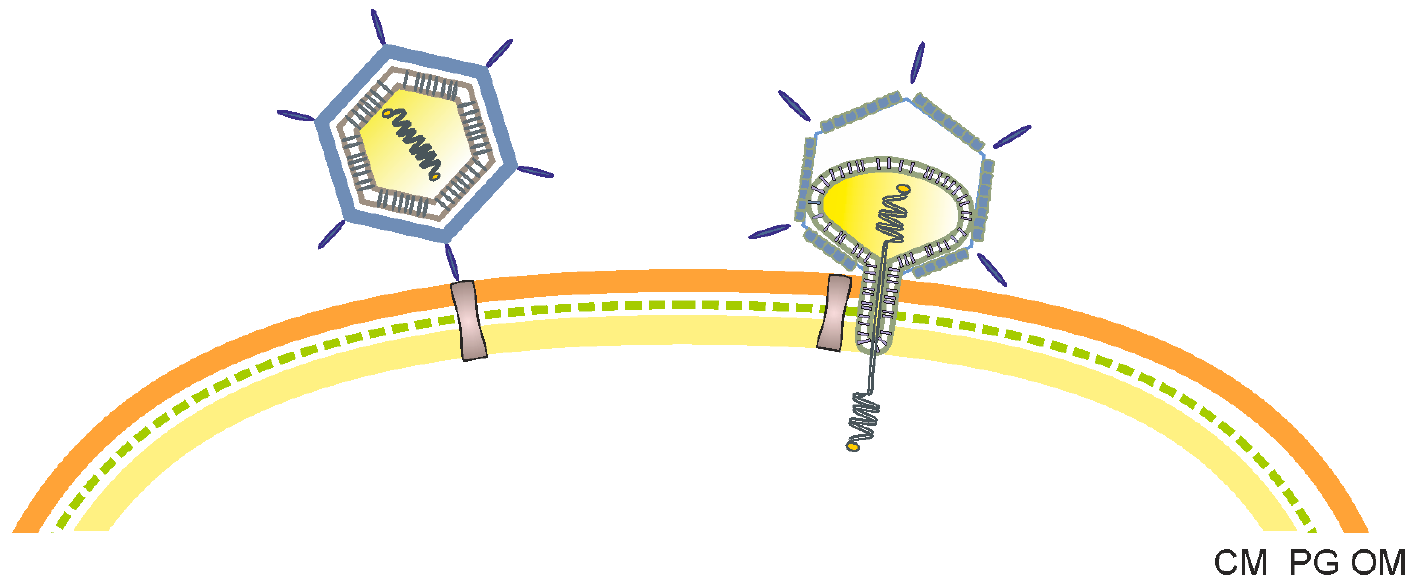
Entry mechanism Enterobacteria phage PRD1

The virions of Tectiviridae species are non-enveloped, icosahedral and display a pseudo T=25 symmetry. The capsid has two layers. The outer layer is a protein structure of 240 capsid proteins trimers, and the inner one is a proteinaceous lipid membrane which envelopes the virus genome. Apical spikes extending about 20 nanometers (nm) protrude from the icosahedrons vertices.

The genome is a single molecule of linear double-stranded DNA of 15 kilobases in length, and has 30 open reading frames. It forms a tightly packed coil and encodes several structural proteins. It encodes about 30 proteins that are transcribed in operons. At least 9 structural proteins are present in the virion. The genome is about 66 megadaltons in weight and constitutes 14–15% of the virion by weight. Lipids constitute a further 15% by weight. Carbohydrates are not present.

== Life cycle ==
Viral replication is cytoplasmic. Entry into the host cell is achieved by adsorption into the host cell. After adsorption to the host cell surface the virion extrudes a tail-tube structure through a vertex for genome delivery into the host. Replication follows the DNA strand displacement model. DNA-templated transcription is the method of transcription. Capsid proteins polymerize around a lipoprotein vesicle translocated in the cytoplasm by virion assembly factors.

Mature virions are released by lysis, which, in the case of PRD1, is achieved with the aid of virus-encoded lysis machinery consisting of four proteins: P15 (endolysin), P35 (holin), P36 and P37 (homologues of the Rz/Rz1 proteins of phage lambda).

== Taxonomy ==
Tectiviridae contains the following genera and species:

- Alphatectivirus
  - Alphatectivirus PR4
  - Alphatectivirus PRD1
- Betatectivirus
  - Betatectivirus AP50
  - Betatectivirus Bam35
  - Betatectivirus GIL16
  - Betatectivirus sato
  - Betatectivirus sole
  - Betatectivirus Wip1
- Deltatectivirus
  - Deltatectivirus forthebois
  - Deltatectivirus wheeheim
- Epsilontectivirus
  - Epsilontectivirus toil
- Gammatectivirus
  - Gammatectivirus GC1

Other unassigned phages:

- Thermus virus phiKo
- Microbacterium virus Badulia
- Microbacterium virus MuffinTheCat
