= Spikebuccinum =

Scientific classification
- Kingdom: Animalia
- Phylum: Mollusca
- Class: Gastropoda
- Subclass: Caenogastropoda
- Order: Neogastropoda
- Family: Prosiphonidae
- Genus: Spikebuccinum; Harasewych & Kantor, 2004

Type species
- Spikebuccinum stephaniae Harasewych & Kantor, 2004

Genus of gastropods

Spikebuccinum is a genus of sea snails, marine gastropod mollusks in the family Prosiphonidae.

== Species ==
Species within the genus Spikebuccinum include:

- Spikebuccinum stephaniae Harasewych & Kantor, 2004
