= Probuccinum tenerum =

Scientific classification
- Kingdom: Animalia
- Phylum: Mollusca
- Class: Gastropoda
- Subclass: Caenogastropoda
- Order: Neogastropoda
- Family: Buccinidae
- Genus: Probuccinum
- Species: P. tenerum

Binomial name
- Probuccinum tenerum (E.A. Smith, 1907)

Synonyms
- Neobuccinum tenerum E. A. Smith, 1907 (original combination); Probuccinum tenuistriatum Hedley, 1916 (superseded combination)

Species of gastropod

Probuccinum tenerum is a species of sea snail, a marine gastropod mollusk in the family Prosiphonidae, the true whelks.

== Distribution ==
This marine species was found off Coulman Island, Antarctica.
