= Neobuccinum eatoni =

Scientific classification
- Kingdom: Animalia
- Phylum: Mollusca
- Class: Gastropoda
- Subclass: Caenogastropoda
- Order: Neogastropoda
- Family: Prosiphonidae
- Genus: Neobuccinum
- Species: N. eatoni

Binomial name
- Neobuccinum eatoni (E.A. Smith, 1875)

Synonyms
- Buccinopsis eatoni E. A. Smith, 1875 (original combination); Chlanidota smithi A. W. B. Powell, 1958; Neobuccinum praeclarum Strebel, 1908

Species of gastropod

Neobuccinum eatoni is a species of sea snail, a marine gastropod mollusk in the family Prosiphonidae, the true whelks.

== Distribution ==
This marine species occurs off Kerguelen Islands.
