= Crenatosipho =

Scientific classification
- Kingdom: Animalia
- Phylum: Mollusca
- Class: Gastropoda
- Subclass: Caenogastropoda
- Order: Neogastropoda
- Family: Prosiphonidae
- Genus: Crenatosipho; K. Linse, 2002

Type species
- Crenatosipho beaglensis K. Linse, 2002

Genus of gastropods

Crenatosipho is a genus of sea snails, marine gastropod mollusks in the family Prosiphonidae.

== Species ==
Species within the genus Crenatosipho include:

- Crenatosipho beaglensis Linse, 2002
