= Parabuccinum =

Scientific classification
- Kingdom: Animalia
- Phylum: Mollusca
- Class: Gastropoda
- Subclass: Caenogastropoda
- Order: Neogastropoda
- Family: Prosiphonidae
- Genus: Parabuccinum; Harasewych, Kantor & Linse, 2000

Genus of gastropods

Parabuccinum is a genus of sea snails, marine gastropod mollusks in the family Prosiphonidae.

== Species ==
Species within the genus Parabuccinum include:

- Parabuccinum bisculptum (Dell, 1990)
- Parabuccinum eltanini (Dell, 1990)
- Parabuccinum ovoideum Kantor, Molodtsova, Zvonareva & Fedosov, 2023
- Parabuccinum politum Pastorino, 2018
- Parabuccinum polyspeirum (Dell, 1990)
- Parabuccinum rauscherti Harasewych, Kantor & Linse, 2000
