= Meteuthria =

Scientific classification
- Kingdom: Animalia
- Phylum: Mollusca
- Class: Gastropoda
- Subclass: Caenogastropoda
- Order: Neogastropoda
- Family: Prosiphonidae
- Genus: Meteuthria; Thiele, 1912

Genus of gastropods

Meteuthria is a genus of sea snails, marine gastropod mollusks in the family Prosiphonidae, the true whelks.

== Species ==
Species within the genus Meteuthria include:

- Meteuthria batialis Pastorino, 2016
- Meteuthria clathratula (Thiele, 1925)
- Meteuthria fallax (Thiele, 1925)
- Meteuthria formosa (Thiele, 1925)
- Meteuthria futilis (Watson, 1882)
- Meteuthria multituberculata Dell, 1990
- Meteuthria martensi (Strebel, 1905)
