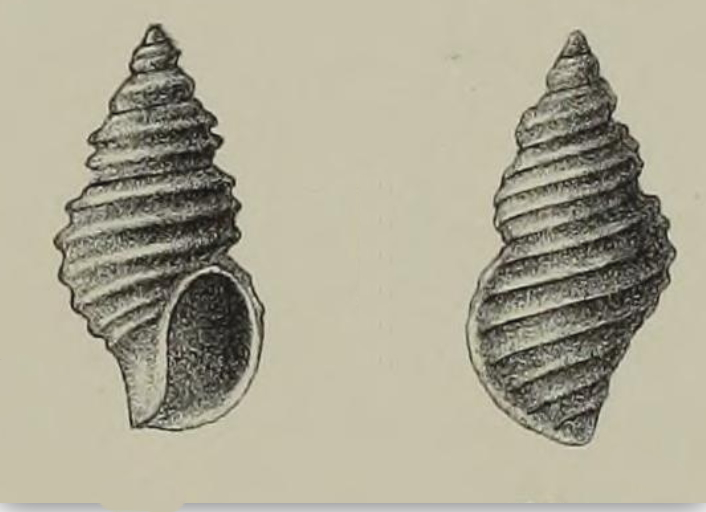
- Shell of Prosipho crassicostatus (holotype)

Scientific classification
- Kingdom: Animalia
- Phylum: Mollusca
- Class: Gastropoda
- Subclass: Caenogastropoda
- Order: Neogastropoda
- Family: Prosiphonidae
- Genus: Prosipho
- Species: P. crassicostatus

Binomial name
- Prosipho crassicostatus (Melvill & Standen, 1907)

Synonyms
- Chrysodomus (Sipho) crassicostatus Melvill & Standen, 1907 · unaccepted (basionym); Chrysodomus crassicostatus Melvill & Standen, 1907; Prosipho aurora Hedley, 1916 (superseded combination)

= Prosipho crassicostatus =

Species of gastropod

Prosipho crassicostatus is a species of sea snail, a marine gastropod mollusk in the family Prosiphonidae, the true whelks.

== Description ==
The length of the shell attains 6 mm, its diameter 3 mm.

(Original description) This is a small, solid seashell with a spindle-like shape. It has a grayish-white color and is covered by a thin, olive-straw colored outer layer. The shell consists of 5 to 6 whorls, with the first few at the top being stepped, smooth, and slightly swollen. The rest of the whorls are covered with thick spiral ridges. The seams between these whorls are indented, giving them a puffy appearance. The body whorl features seven of these distinct ridges with smooth areas between them. The aperture is oval, and the outer lip is slightly flared. The central columella is hollowed out, and the base is cut short.

== Distribution ==
This marine species occurs off the Falkland Islands and the South Orkney Islands.
