= Probuccinum =

Scientific classification
- Kingdom: Animalia
- Phylum: Mollusca
- Class: Gastropoda
- Subclass: Caenogastropoda
- Order: Neogastropoda
- Family: Buccinidae
- Genus: Probuccinum; Thiele, 1912

Type species
- Neobuccinum tenerum E. A. Smith, 1907

Genus of gastropods

Probuccinum is a genus of sea snails and marine gastropod mollusks in the family Prosiphonidae.

== Species ==
Species within the genus Probuccinum include:

- Probuccinum angulatum Powell, 1951
- Probuccinum archibenthale (Melvill & Standen, 1907)
- Probuccinum costatum Thiele, 1912
- Probuccinum delicatulum Powell, 1951
- Probuccinum edwardiense (R. B. Watson, 1882)
- Probuccinum tenerum (Smith, 1907)

Species brought into synonymy

- Probuccinum regulus (R. B. Watson, 1882): synonym of Pareuthria regulus (R. B. Watson, 1882)
- Probuccinum tenuistriatum Hedley, 1916: synonym of Probuccinum tenerum (E. A. Smith, 1907)
