= Chlanidotella =

Scientific classification
- Kingdom: Animalia
- Phylum: Mollusca
- Class: Gastropoda
- Subclass: Caenogastropoda
- Order: Neogastropoda
- Family: Prosiphonidae
- Genus: Chlanidotella; Thiele, 1929

Synonyms
- Thalassoplanes (Chlanidotella) Thiele, 1929 (original rank)

Genus of gastropods

Chlanidotella is a genus of sea snails, marine gastropod mollusks in the family Prosiphonidae.

== Genera ==
- Chlanidotella modesta (E. von Martens, 1885)
