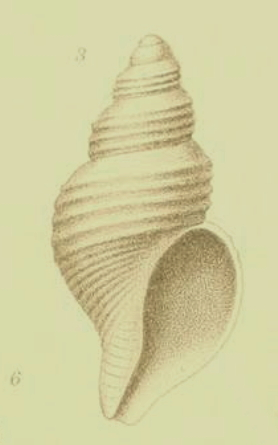
- Shell of Prosipho gaussianus (holotype)

Scientific classification
- Kingdom: Animalia
- Phylum: Mollusca
- Class: Gastropoda
- Subclass: Caenogastropoda
- Order: Neogastropoda
- Family: Prosiphonidae
- Genus: Prosipho
- Species: P. gaussianus

Binomial name
- Prosipho gaussianus Thiele, 1912

= Prosipho gaussianus =

Species of gastropod

Prosipho gaussianus is a species of sea snail, a marine gastropod mollusk in the family Prosiphonidae, the true whelks.

== Description ==
(Original description in German) The shells are distinguished by their regular, smooth initial whorls, slightly protruding spiral ridges, and a relatively long siphonal canal. They are approximately 8.5 mm high and 4 mm in diameter.

The shell has five convex whorls that increase in size at a moderate rate. The first two are smooth and rounded, while the subsequent whorls are sculpted with distinct, but not highly raised, narrow spiral ridges separated by wide gaps. The middle whorls typically have four of these ridges. One or two weaker ridges may also appear on the lower whorls, and the underside of the body whorl shows several dense, flat ridges. The body whorl merges gradually into the straight lower process. The aperture is an elongated oval, which also blends smoothly into the slightly oblique siphonal canal.

The radula features a fairly large central plate that widens toward the front and has three equally sized, pointed, and divergent denticles. The lateral plate has a narrow cutting edge with three cusps. The innermost cusp is quite wide and short, while the other two are positioned close together, with the middle one being larger than the outer one.

== Distribution ==
This species occurs in Antarctic waters.
