= Falsitromina okutanii =

Scientific classification
- Kingdom: Animalia
- Phylum: Mollusca
- Class: Gastropoda
- Subclass: Caenogastropoda
- Order: Neogastropoda
- Superfamily: Buccinoidea
- Family: Prosiphonidae
- Genus: Falsitromina
- Species: F. okutanii

Binomial name
- Falsitromina okutanii (Numanami, 1996)

Synonyms
- Antarctodomus okutanii Numanami, 1996 (original combination); Falsimohnia okutanii (Numanami, 1996)

Species of gastropod

Falsitromina okutanii is a species of sea snail, a marine gastropod mollusk in the family Prosiphonidae.
