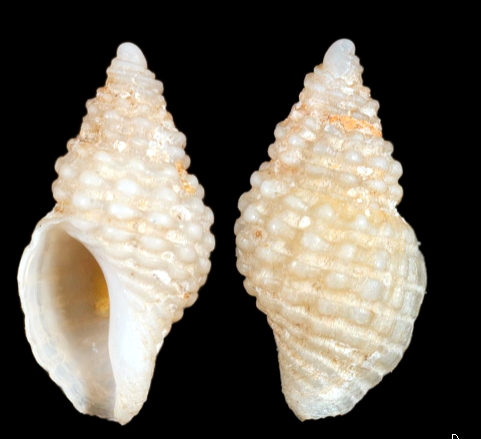
- Shell of Antistreptus magellanicus

Scientific classification
- Kingdom: Animalia
- Phylum: Mollusca
- Class: Gastropoda
- Subclass: Caenogastropoda
- Order: Neogastropoda
- Family: Prosiphonidae
- Genus: Antistreptus; Dall, 1902

= Antistreptus =

Genus of gastropod

Antistreptus is a genus of sea snail, a marine gastropod mollusk in the family Prosiphonidae, the true whelks.

== Description ==
(Original description) The shell is small, exhibiting the general form of Anachis, and is sinistral, but possesses a dextral nucleus. The operculum is as in Trophon.

== Species ==
- Antistreptus contrarius (Thiele, 1912)
- Antistreptus magellanicus Dall, 1902
- Antistreptus perversus (A. W. B. Powell, 1951)
- Antistreptus reversus (A. W. B. Powell, 1958)

Synonyms

- Antistreptus rolani Castellanos, 1986: synonym of Antistreptus magellanicus Dall, 1902
