= Bacillus virus AP50 =

Bacteriophage AP50

Virus classification
- (unranked): Virus
- Realm: Varidnaviria
- Kingdom: Bamfordvirae
- Phylum: Preplasmiviricota
- Class: Tectiliviricetes
- Order: Kalamavirales
- Family: Tectiviridae
- Genus: Betatectivirus
- Species: Betatectivirus AP50

Synonyms
- Bacillus phage AP50; Bacillus virus AP50; Phage AP50

Species of virus

Bacillus virus AP50 is a species of bacteriophage that infects Bacillus anthracis bacteria. Originally thought to be an RNA phage, it contains a DNA genome of about 14,000 base pairs in an icosahedral capsid with a two-layer capsid shell.
