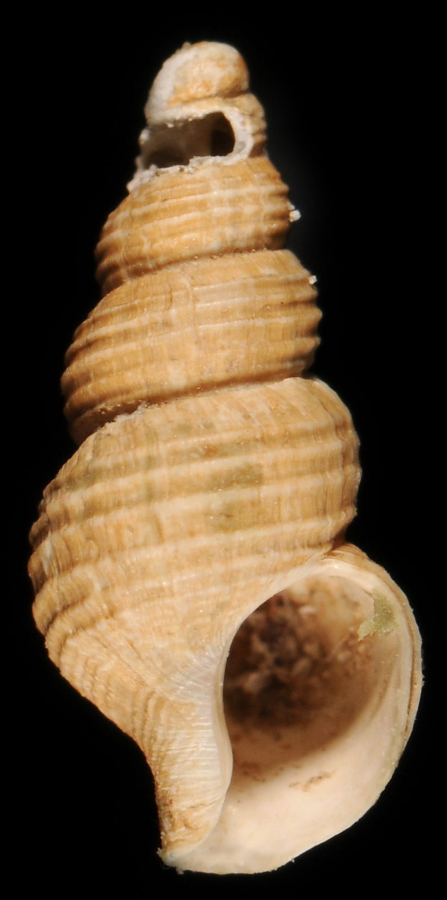
- Shell of Prosipho antarctidis (specimen at the Smithsonian Institution)

Scientific classification
- Kingdom: Animalia
- Phylum: Mollusca
- Class: Gastropoda
- Subclass: Caenogastropoda
- Order: Neogastropoda
- Family: Prosiphonidae
- Genus: Prosipho
- Species: P. antarctidis

Binomial name
- Prosipho antarctidis (Pelseneer, 1903)

Synonyms
- Prosipho similis Thiele, 1912; Sipho antarctidis Pelseneer, 1903 (original combination)

= Prosipho antarctidis =

Species of gastropod

Prosipho antarctidis is a species of sea snail, a marine gastropod mollusk in the family Prosiphonidae, the true whelks.

== Description ==
(Described in German as Prosipho similis) This shell measuries 7.5 mm high and 3 mm wide, and consists of 6 whorls. The first 1.5 whorls are smooth, relatively large, and rounded. The remaining whorls are covered with strong spiral ridges. Typically, four ridges are visible on each whorl, with a weaker one sometimes appearing below the suture on the lower whorls. The body whorl has a ridge where the suture attaches, along with several other more or less distinct ridges on the underside and the relatively short, straight siphonal canal. The shell as a whole is tall and turreted, with whorls that are rounded and increase in size uniformly. The aperture is oval with a fairly short siphonal canal.

The radula has a central plate that is longer than it is wide, with three equally sized, pointed teeth that span its entire width. The lateral plates have a moderately wide cutting edge with five cusps. The three middle cusps are larger than the ones at the ends. The base of the lateral plate extends outward and forward into a fairly long process.

== Distribution ==
This species was found at Cape Colbeck, Ross Sea, Antarctica.
