= Prosiphonidae =

Scientific classification
- Kingdom: Animalia
- Phylum: Mollusca
- Class: Gastropoda
- Subclass: Caenogastropoda
- Order: Neogastropoda
- Superfamily: Buccinoidea
- Family: Prosiphonidae; A. W. B. Powell, 1951

Genera
- See text

Synonyms
- Prosiphiinae ·misspelling - incorrect original spelling; Prosiphoninae A. W. B. Powell, 1951 superseded rank

Family of large sea snails

The Prosiphonidae are a taxonomic family of large sea snails, often known as whelks or true whelks.

== Genera ==
- Anomacme Strebel, 1905
- Antarctodomus Dell, 1972
- Antistreptus Dall, 1902
- Argeneuthria Pastorino, 2016
- Austrofusus Kobelt, 1879
- Bathydomus Thiele, 1912
- Cavineptunea A. W. B. Powell, 1951
- Chlanidota E. von Martens, 1878
- Chlanidotella Thiele, 1929
- Chlanificula A. W. B. Powell, 1958
- Crenatosipho K. Linse, 2002
- Drepanodontus Harasewych & Kantor, 2004
- Falsimacme Pastorino, 2016
- Falsimohnia A. W. B. Powell, 1951
- Falsitromina Dell, 1990
- Fusinella Thiele, 1917
- Germonea Harasewych & Kantor, 2004
- Meteuthria Thiele, 1912
- Muffinbuccinum Harasewych & Kantor, 2004
- Neobuccinum E. A. Smith, 1879
- Parabuccinum Harasewych, Kantor & K. Linse, 2000
- Probuccinum Thiele, 1912
- Proneptunea Thiele, 1912
- Prosipho Thiele, 1912
- Savatieria Rochebrune & Mabille, 1885
- Scotiabuccinum Kantor, Molodtsova, Zvonareva & Fedosov, 2023
- Spikebuccinum Harasewych & Kantor, 2004
- Strebela Kantor & Harasewych, 2013

Synonyms

- Aethocola Iredale, 1915: synonym of Austrofusus Kobelt, 1879
- Buccinella Thiele, 1912: synonym of Fusinella Thiele, 1917 (invalid: junior homonym of Buccinella Perry, 1811; Fusinella and Buccinola are replacement names)
- Buccinola Strand, 1928: synonym of Fusinella Thiele, 1917
- Pfefferia Strebel, 1908 synonym of Chlanidota E. von Martens, 1878
