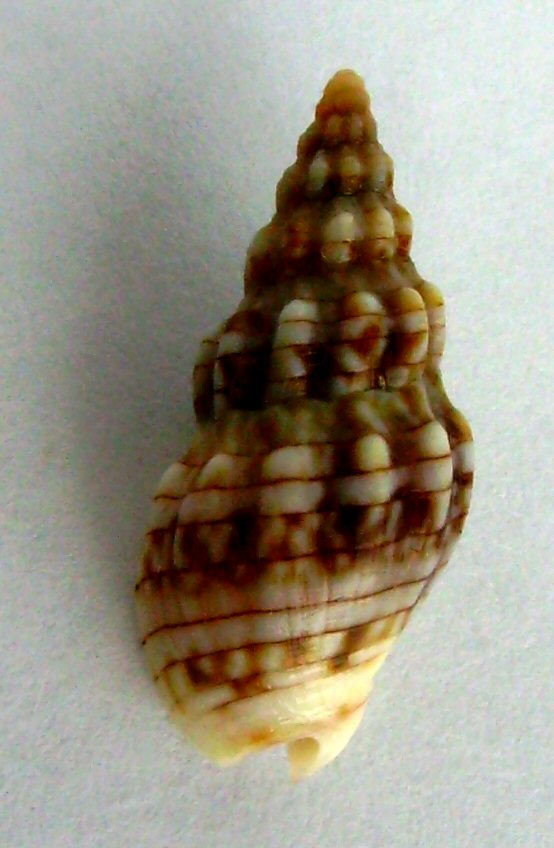
- Cominella quoyana

Scientific classification
- Kingdom: Animalia
- Phylum: Mollusca
- Class: Gastropoda
- Subclass: Caenogastropoda
- Order: Neogastropoda
- Superfamily: Buccinoidea
- Family: Cominellidae
- Genus: Cominella; Gray, 1850

Type species
- Buccinum testudineum Bruguière, 1789<

Synonyms
- Acominia Finlay, 1926; † Cominella (Austrocominella) Ihering, 1907 · accepted, alternate representation; Cominella (Cominella) Gray, 1850 · accepted, alternate representation; Cominella (Eucominia) Finlay, 1926 · accepted, alternate representation; Cominella (Josepha) Tenison Woods, 1878 (accepted, alternate representation); Cominella (Procominula) Finlay, 1926 (accepted, alternate representation); Eucominia Finlay, 1926; Zephos Finlay, 1926

= Cominella =

Cominella Temporal range: Late Oligocene to Recent, 27.3–0.0 Ma

Genus of gastropods

Cominella is a genus of carnivorous sea snails, a marine gastropod mollusc in the family Cominellidae.

== Description ==
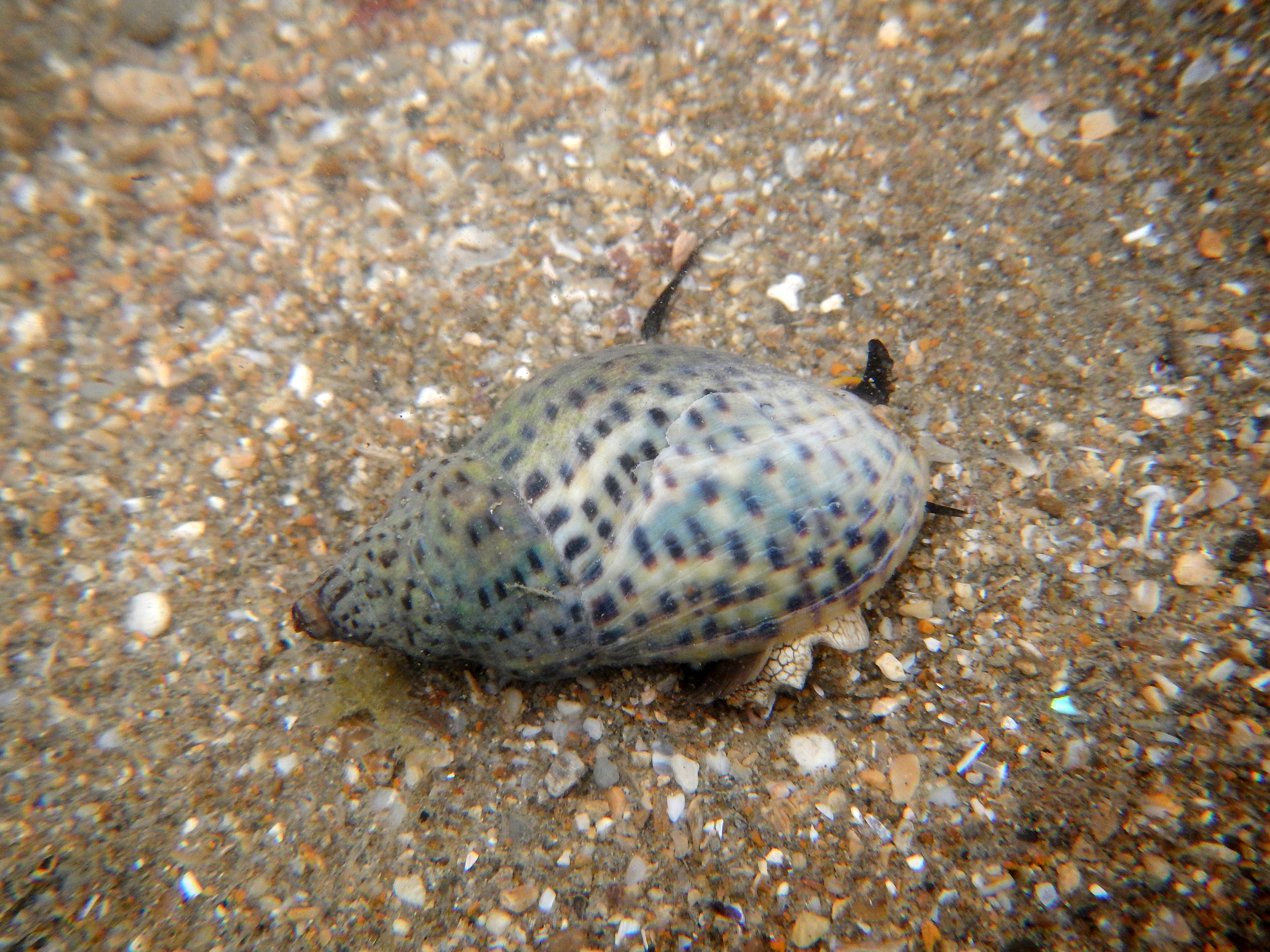
A live Cominella adspersa at Castlepoint, New Zealand.

Cominella is a genus of medium-sized buccinoid marine snails. All species are carnivores.

== Distribution ==
Many extant species are endemic to coastal waters off of New Zealand and Australia (including Norfolk Island). There is a rich fossil record in New Zealand. Species are common within the intertidal and subtidal zone.

== Evolution ==
Cominella is currently classified within the family Buccinidae, although it has also been classified within the alternative families Buccinulidae and Cominellidae.

Ancestors of Cominella species in Australia likely migrated from New Zealand via long-distance egg rafting, despite taxa exhibiting direct development. Cominella is closely related to the genus Pareuthria.

== Species ==
Species and subspecies (indented) in the genus Cominella include:

- Cominella accuminata (Hutton, 1885)
- Cominella acutinodosa (Reeve, 1846)
- Cominella adspersa (Bruguière, 1789)
- Cominella alertae (Dell, 1956)
- † Cominella altispira (Marwick, 1948)
- † Cominella bauckei (Marwick, 1928)
- Cominella cantuariensis (Dell, 1951)
- † Cominella chattonensis (Finlay, 1926)
- † Cominella chorista (Dell, 1952)
- † Cominella cingulata (Hutton, 1885)
- † Cominella compacta (Marwick, 1926)
- † Cominella crassinodosa (Marwick, 1931)
- † Cominella denselirata (Finlay, 1926)
- † Cominella dingleyi (Marwick, 1948)
- Cominella eburnea (Reeve, 1846)
- Cominella elegantula elegantula (Powell, 1946)
  - Cominella elegantula marlboroughensis (Powell, 1946)
- † Cominella ellisoni (Marwick, 1928)
- † Cominella excoriata (Finlay, 1926)
  - Cominella excoriata tolagaensis (Ponder, 1968)
- † Cominella exsculpta (Suter, 1917)
- † Cominella facinerosa (Bartrum & Powell, 1928)
- Cominella glandiformis (Reeve, 1847)
- † Cominella graemei (Wells, 1986)
- Cominella griseicalx Willan, 1978
- † Cominella hamiltoni (Hutton, 1885)
- † Cominella hendersoni (Marwick, 1926)
- † Cominella incisa (Hutton, 1885)
- † Cominella intermedia (Suter, 1917)
- † Cominella kereruensis (Laws, 1932)
- Cominella lineolata (Lamarck, 1809)
- Cominella maculosa (Martyn, 1784)
- † Cominella marshalli (Laws, 1932)
- Cominella mirabilis mirabilis (Powell, 1929)
  - Cominella mirabilis canturiensis (Dell, 1951)
  - Cominella mirabilis powelli (Fleming, 1948)
- † Cominella nana (Finlay, 1926)
- Cominella nassoides nassoides (Reeve, 1846)
  - Cominella nassoides consobrina (Powell, 1933)
  - Cominella nassoides haroldi (Powell, 1946)
  - Cominella nassoides irdalei (Finlay, 1928)
  - Cominella nassoides nodicincta (Martens, 1878)
  - Cominella nassoides otakauica (Powell, 1946)
- Cominella necopinata (Finlay, 1930)
- Cominella norfolkensis (Iredale, 1940)
- †Cominella obsoleta (Finlay, 1926)
- Cominella olsoni (Dell, 1956)
- † Cominella onokeana (L. C. King, 1933)
- Cominella otagoensis (Finlay, 1927)
- Cominella powelli (Fleming, 1948)
- † Cominella praecox (Finlay, 1926)
- † Cominella propinqua (Finlay, 1926)
- † Cominella pukeuriensis (Finlay, 1926)
- † Cominella pulchra (Suter, 1917)
- † Cominella purchasi (Suter, 1917)
- † Cominella putangirua (King, 1933)
- Cominella quoyana (A. Adams, 1854)
- Cominella regalis (Willian, 1977)
- † Cominella ridicula (Finlay, 1926)
- † Cominella scirrifer (Laws, 1933)
- Cominella tasmanica (Tenison Woods, 1878)
- Cominella testudinea (Bruguière, 1789)
- Cominella tolagaensis (Ponder, 1968)
- † Cominella tuturewa (Fleming, 1943)
- Cominella virgata (A. Adams, 1853)

Species brought into synonymy

- Cominella accuminata (Hutton, 1893): synonym of Cominella quoyana accuminata (Hutton, 1893)
- Cominella acutispira (Sowerby, 1821): synonym of Nucella dubia (Krauss, 1848)
- Cominella albolirata (Tenison Woods, 1879): synonym of Haustrum vinosum (Lamarck, 1822)
- Cominella alfredensis (Bartsch, 1915): synonym of Afrocominella capensis simoniana (Petit de la Saussaye, 1852)
- Cominella angusta (G. B. Sowerby III, 1886): synonym of Clathranachis angusta (G. B. Sowerby III, 1886)
- Cominella bouveti (Thiele, 1912): synonym of Notoficula bouveti (Thiele, 1912)
- Cominella capensis (Dunker in Philippi, 1844): synonym of Afrocominella capensis (Dunker, 1844)
- Cominella cincta (Röding, 1798): synonym of Burnupena cincta (Röding, 1798)
- Cominella densesculpta (Martens, 1885): synonym of Chlanidota densesculpta (Martens, 1885)
- Cominella dunkeri (Kobelt, 1878): synonym of Burnupena cincta cincta (Röding, 1798)
- Cominella eburneum [sic]: synonym of Cominella eburnea (Reeve, 1846)
- Cominella elongata (Dunker, 1857): synonym of Afrocominella capensis (Dunker in Philippi, 1844)
- Cominella euthriaformis (Powell, 1929): synonym of Cominella quoyana (A. Adams, 1855)
- Cominella filicea (Crosse & Fischer, 1864): synonym of Cominella eburnea var. filicea (Crosse & Fischer, 1864): synonym of Cominella eburnea (Reeve, 1846)
- Cominella fortilirata (G. B. Sowerby III, 1913): synonym of Aulacofusus periscelidus (Dall, 1891)
- † Cominella fueguensis (Ihering, 1907): synonym of † Austrocominella fueguensis (Ihering, 1907)
- Cominella fuscopicta (Turton, 1932): synonym of Vaughtia fenestrata (Gould, 1860)
- Cominella glandiforme [sic]: synonym of Cominella glandiformis (Reeve, 1847)
- Cominella haroldi (Powell, 1946): synonym of Cominella nassoides haroldi (Powell, 1946)
- Cominella koperbergi (K. Martin, 1933): synonym of Buccinaria jonkeri (Koperberg, 1931)
- Cominella maculata (Gray, 1835): synonym of Cominella adspersa (Bruguière, 1789)
- Cominella marlboroughensis (Powell, 1946): synonym of Cominella elegantula (Finlay, 1926)
- Cominella necopinata (Finlay, 1930)
- Cominella nodicincta (Martens, 1878): synonym of Cominella (Eucominia) nassoides nodicincta (Martens, 1878) represented as Cominella nassoides nodicincta (Martens, 1878)
- Cominella porcata (Gmelin, 1791): synonym of Cominella cincta (Röding, 1798): synonym of Burnupena cincta (Röding, 1798)
- Cominella prolongata (E. A. Smith, 1899): synonym of Fusinus ocelliferus (Lamarck, 1816)
- Cominella puncturata (G.B. Sowerby III, 1886): synonym of Vaughtia fenestrata (Gould, 1860)
- Cominella retifera (K. Martin, 1933): synonym of Buccinaria jonkeri (Koperberg, 1931)
- Cominella semisulcata (G. B. Sowerby III, 1892): synonym of Burnupena cincta cincta (Röding, 1798)
- Cominella subrostrata (W. Wood, 1828): synonym of Nicema subrostrata (W. Wood, 1828)
- Cominella sulcata (G.B. Sowerby III, 1892): synonym of Maorimorpha sulcata (Sowerby III, 1892)
- Cominella translucida (Turton, 1932): synonym of Burnupena pubescens (Küster, 1858)
- Cominella turtoni (Bartsch, 1915): synonym of Afrocominella turtoni (Bartsch, 1915)
- Cominella unifasciata (G.B. Sowerby III, 1886): synonym of Nucella castanea (Küster, 1886)
- Cominella vestita (Martens, 1878): synonym of Chlanidota vestita (Martens, 1878)
