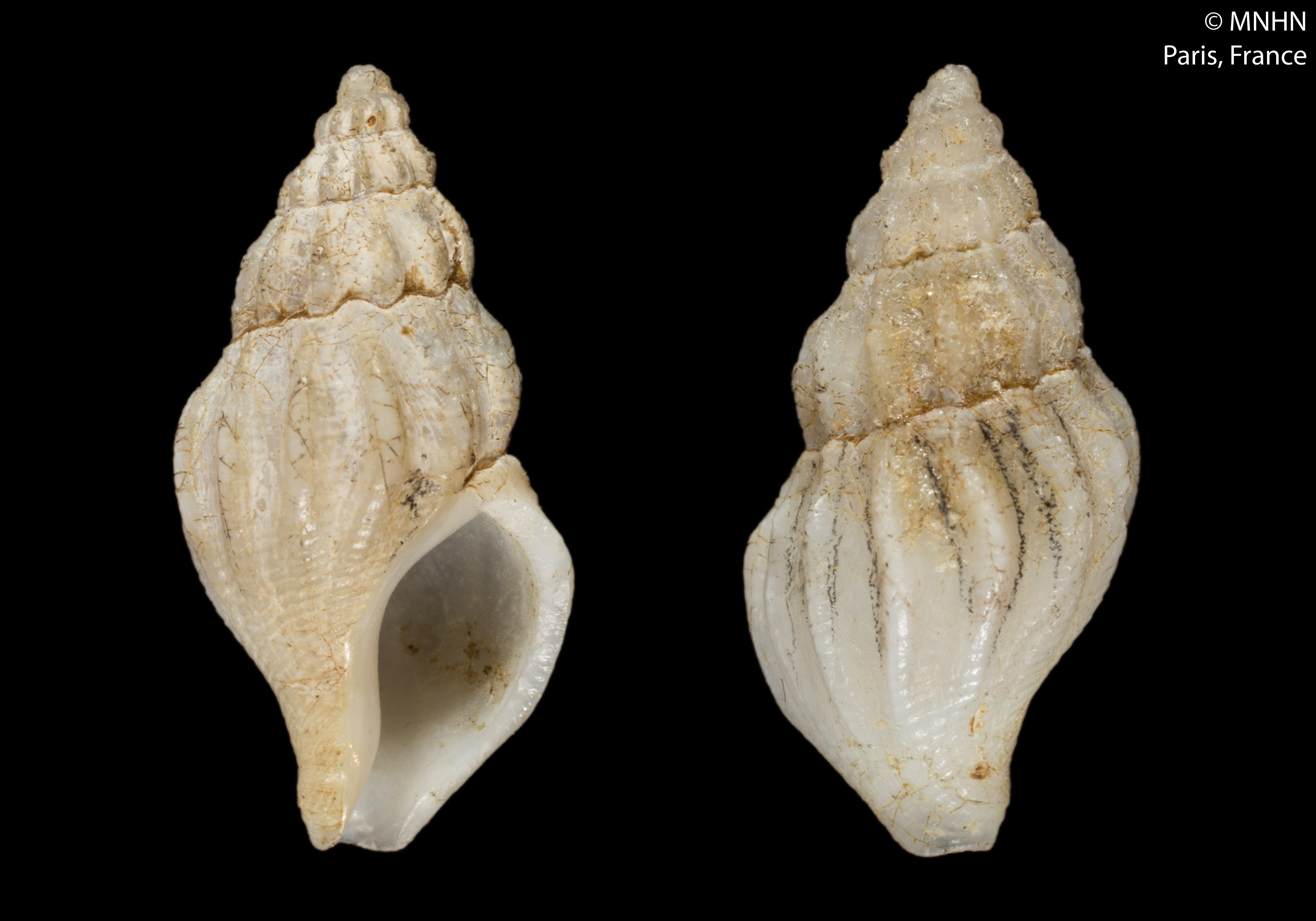

Scientific classification
- Kingdom: Animalia
- Phylum: Mollusca
- Class: Gastropoda
- Subclass: Caenogastropoda
- Order: Neogastropoda
- Family: Cominellidae
- Genus: Pareuthria
- Species: P. atrata

Binomial name
- Pareuthria atrata (E. A. Smith, 1881)

Synonyms
- Euthria atrata E. A. Smith, 1881 (original combination); Euthria candidata (Mabille & Rochebrune, 1889); Euthria ringei Strebel, 1905; Euthria rosea (Hombron & Jacquinot, 1848); Fusus (Sipho) scalaris R. B. Watson, 1882; Fusus roseus Hombron & Jacquinot, 1848 (invalid: junior homonym of Fusus roseus Anton, 1838; Pareuthria powelli is a replacement name); Fusus scalaris R. B. Watson, 1882 (invalid: junior objective of Fusus scalaris Lamarck, 1816); Pareuthria candidata (Mabille & Rochebrune, 1889); Pareuthria powelli Cernohorsky, 1977; Pareuthria ringei (Strebel, 1905); Pareuthria rosea (Hombron & Jacquinot, 1848); Trophon candidatus Mabille & Rochebrune

= Pareuthria atrata =

Species of gastropod

Pareuthria atrata is a species of sea snail, a marine gastropod mollusk in the family Cominellidae.

== Description ==
Shell medium-sized, up to 22 mm in height, fusiform, of six convex whorls; protoconch of 2 ½ convex whorls, translucent, smooth, transition to teleoconch well defined; suture impressed, aperture oval, labrum expanded, sharp, with a small, curved subsutural slit; siphonal canal short; parietal callus very thin; axial ornamentation of about 10 to 12 varices, complete in all whorls but the last, where they vanish below middle whorl; some specimens, only with weak varices on the early whorls; spiral ornamentation of about 15 characteristic, regularly spaced striae per whorl, 30 on the last; periostracum absent (?); color typically pinkish, reddish or dark purple, inside creamy white; operculum brown, ovate, nucleus subterminal. Radula rachiglossate, very similar to P. fuscata, but the cusps of the lateral teeth are more closely spaced in P. atrata, particularly in the juvenile specimens. Penis large, long, subrectangular, flat, generally similar to that of Pareuthria fuscata. Some minor differences are likely due to the reproductive stage and the reaction to critical point drying method.

== Distribution ==
Off Buenos Aires province to Ushuaia, Tierra del Fuego, Malvinas and Staten Island, Argentina in the Atlantic; Southern Chile, Punta Arenas, to Calbuco (41°S) in the Pacific Ocean.
