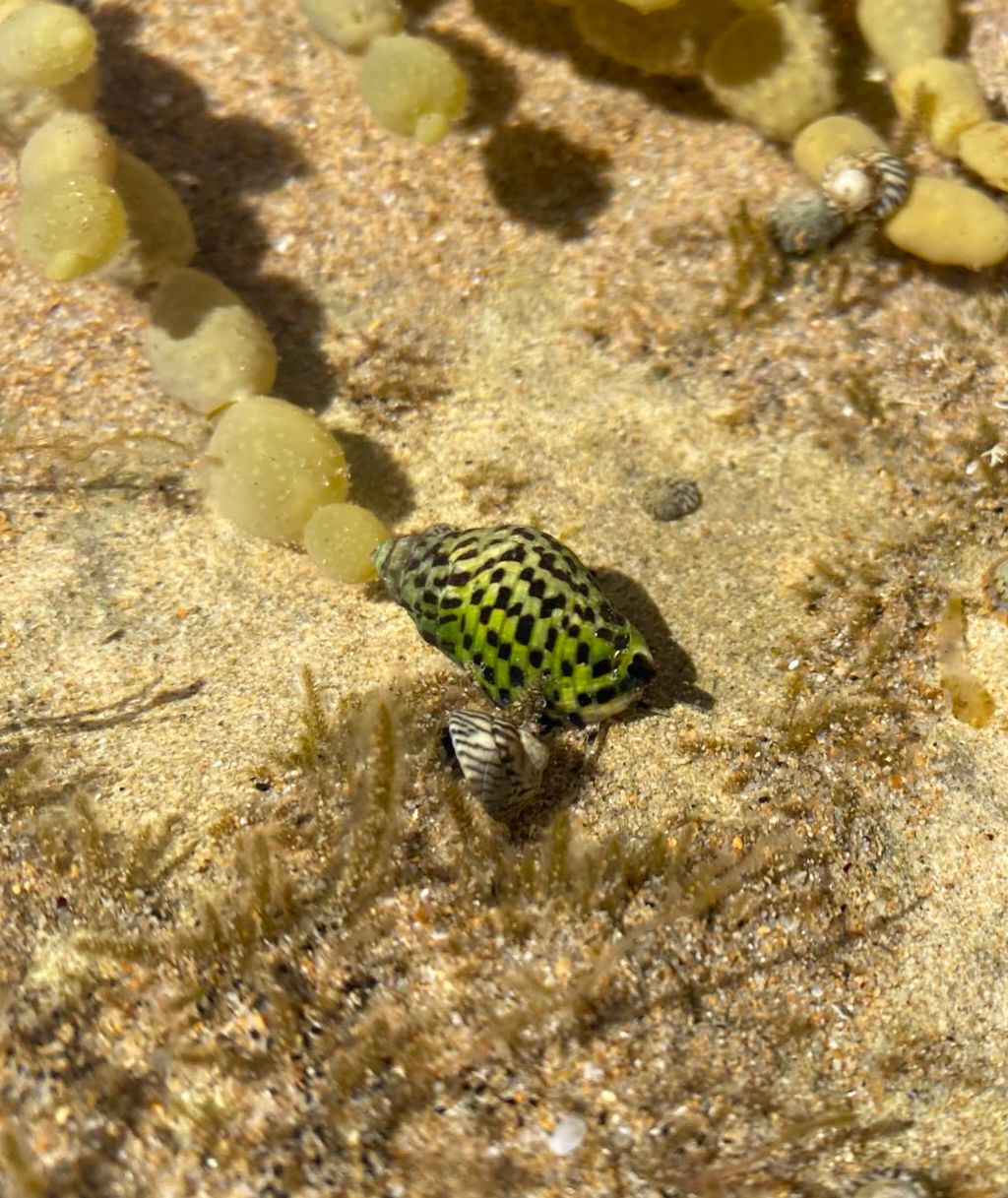
- Live individual of the species, showing the bands which form what appears to be a checkerboard pattern

Scientific classification
- Kingdom: Animalia
- Phylum: Mollusca
- Class: Gastropoda
- Subclass: Caenogastropoda
- Order: Neogastropoda
- Family: Cominellidae
- Genus: Cominella
- Species: C. lineolata

Binomial name
- Cominella lineolata (Lamarck, 1809)

Synonyms
- Buccinum alveolatum Kiener, L.C., 1834; Buccinum lineolatum Lamarck, 1816 (original combination); Buccinum pluriannulata Reeve, L.A. 1846; Cominella (Josepha) lineolata (Lamarck, 1809) · accepted, alternate representation

= Cominella lineolata =

Species of gastropod

Cominella lineolata, common name the spotted cominella, is a species of predatory sea snail, a marine gastropod mollusc in the family Cominellidae.

== Description ==
The length of the shell varies between 20 mm and 39 mm.

The smooth shell is spindle-shaped. The spire is elongated and pointed. The siphonal canal is short. The oval aperture is pretty large. The outer lip is marked throughout its whole extent by deep violet colored lines, crossed by white lines. The columella is smooth, and of a bright yellow color, as well as the edge of the right lip. Externally, the ground color is of a greenish brown, banded with black. These transverse striae are definite and at regular distances; six or eight appear on the body whorl. The operculum is very small, unguiculated, pointed, and of a reddish brown.

== Distribution ==
This marine species occurs off New Zealand and Australia (New South Wales, South Australia, Tasmania, Victoria, Western Australia).
