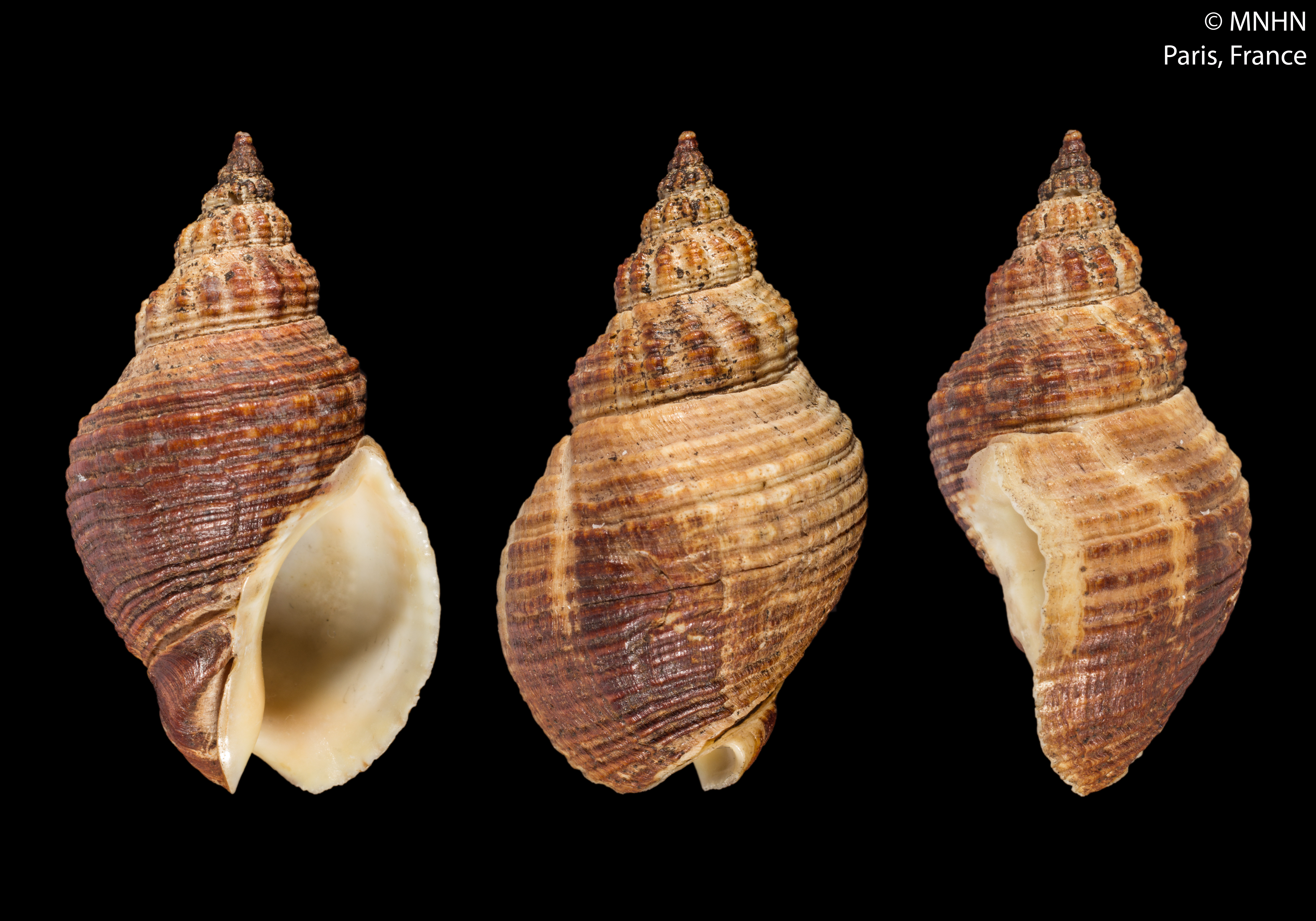
- Shell of Cominella adspersa (holotype at MNHN, Paris)

Scientific classification
- Kingdom: Animalia
- Phylum: Mollusca
- Class: Gastropoda
- Subclass: Caenogastropoda
- Order: Neogastropoda
- Superfamily: Buccinoidea
- Family: Cominellidae
- Genus: Cominella
- Species: C. adspersa

Binomial name
- Cominella adspersa (Bruguière, 1789)

Synonyms
- Acominia adspersa (Bruguiere, 1789); Acominia adspersa nimia Finlay, 1928 (synonym); Buccinum adspersum Bruguière, 1789 (basionym); Buccinum maculatum Martyn, 1784 (Martyn, 1784 is a work rejected for nomenclatorial purposes (see ICZN opinions 456 and 479)); Buccinum melo Lesson, 1840 (synonym); Buccinum quoyii Kiener, 1834; Cominella (Cominella) adspersa (Bruguière, 1789) · accepted, alternate representation; Cominella maculata (Gray, 1835); Cominella maculata melo (Lesson, 1840); Purpura maculata Gray, 1835

= Cominella adspersa =

Species of gastropod

Cominella adspersa, the speckled whelk or kawari in Maori, is a predatory sea snail, a marine gastropod mollusc in the family Cominellidae.

== Description ==
The length of the shell varies between 25 mm and 75 mm.

The oblong-ovate shell is of a red brown color. It is furrowed throughout its whole extent by regular transverse striae, numerous, pretty near, interwoven by other very fine longitudinal striae. The pointed spire is composed of seven whorls. Each whorl, except the lowest, is adorned with longitudinal tubercles or ribs. The columella projectis a little above an incipient umbilicus, which penetrates it at the base of the emargination. The ovular aperture is provided with a callosity upon the left lip, which is of a beautiful reddish color. The pouter lip is arched, plaited upon the internal edge as often as there are striae externally.

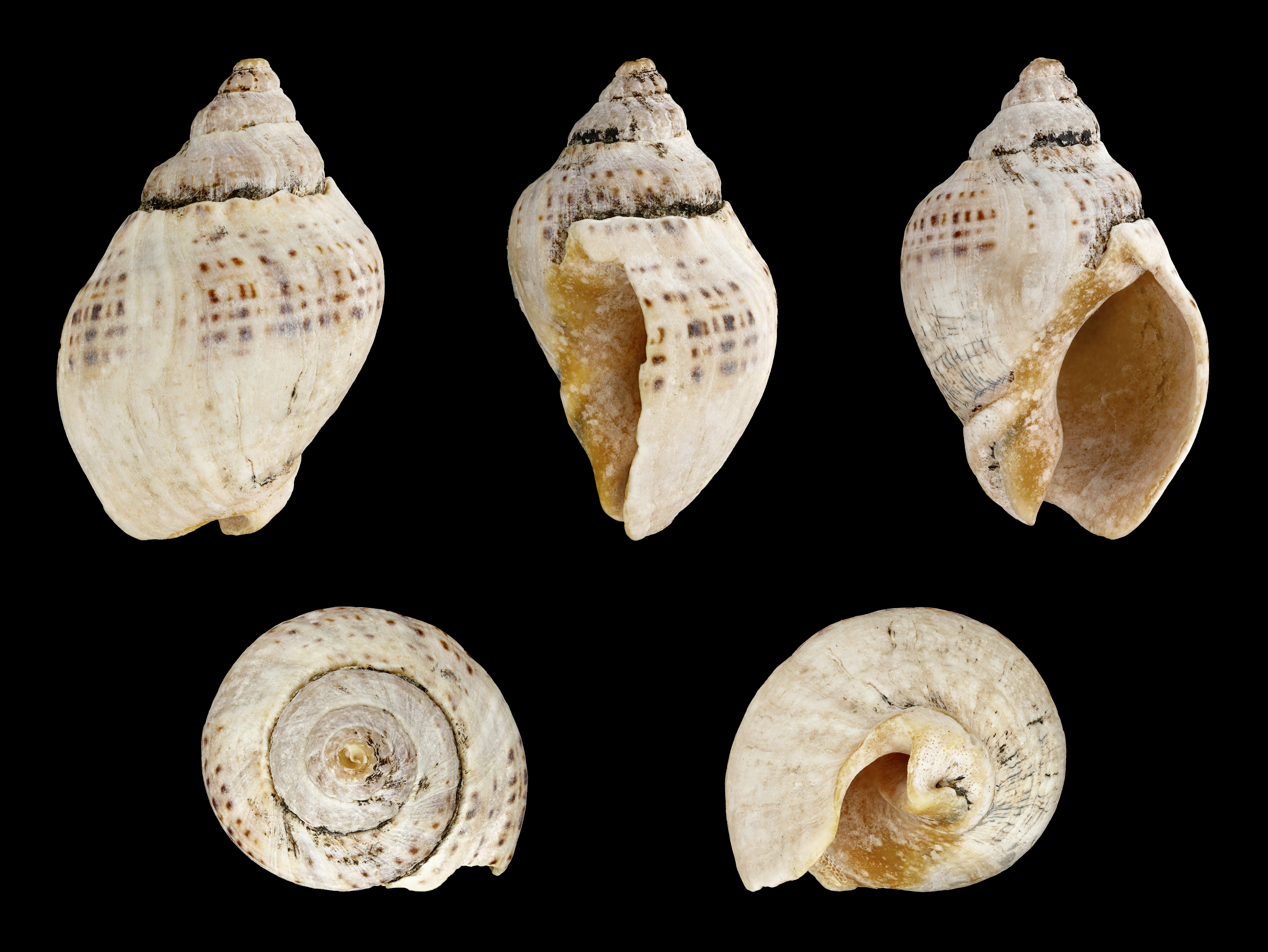
Views of a shell

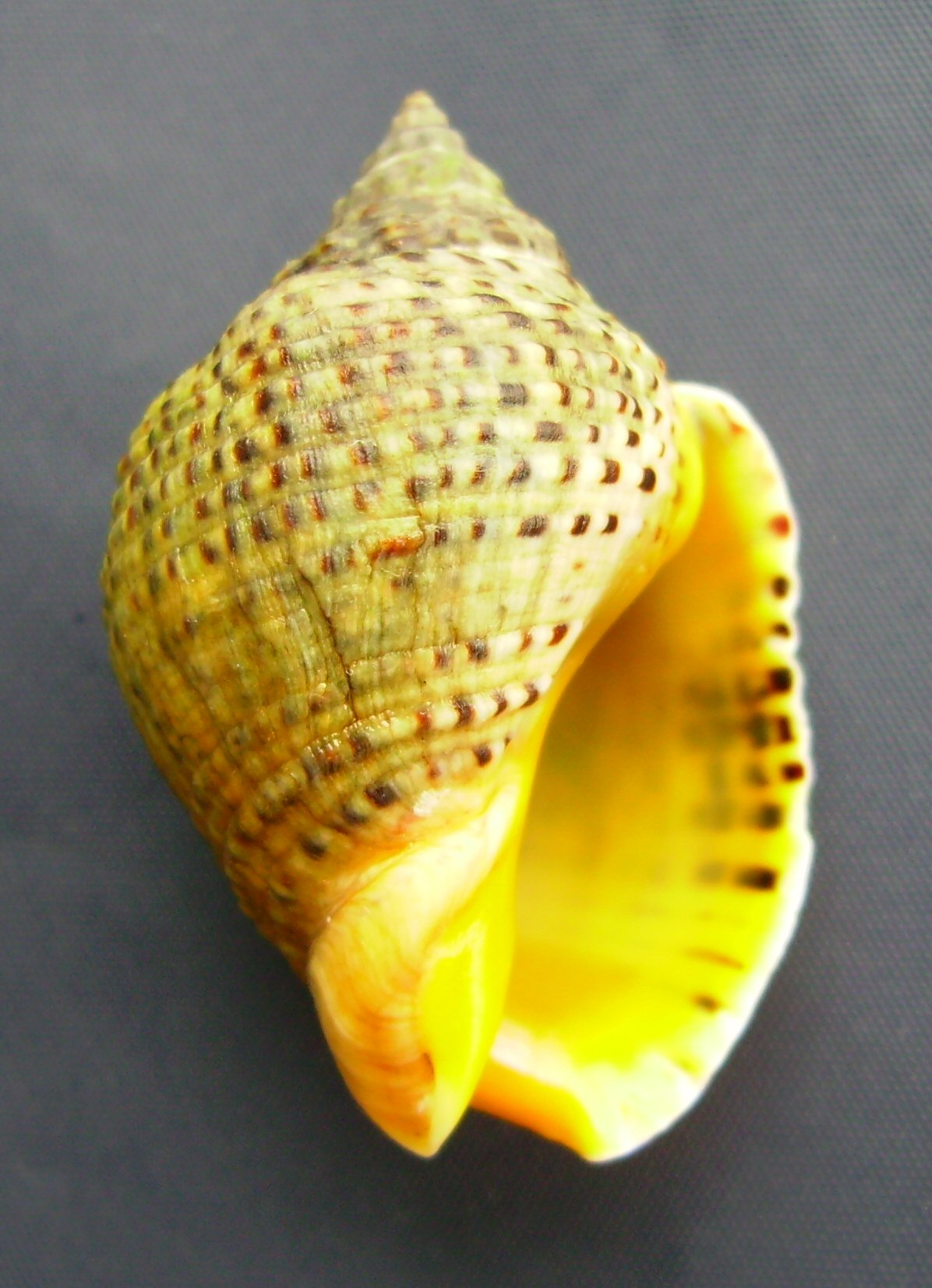
Apertural view

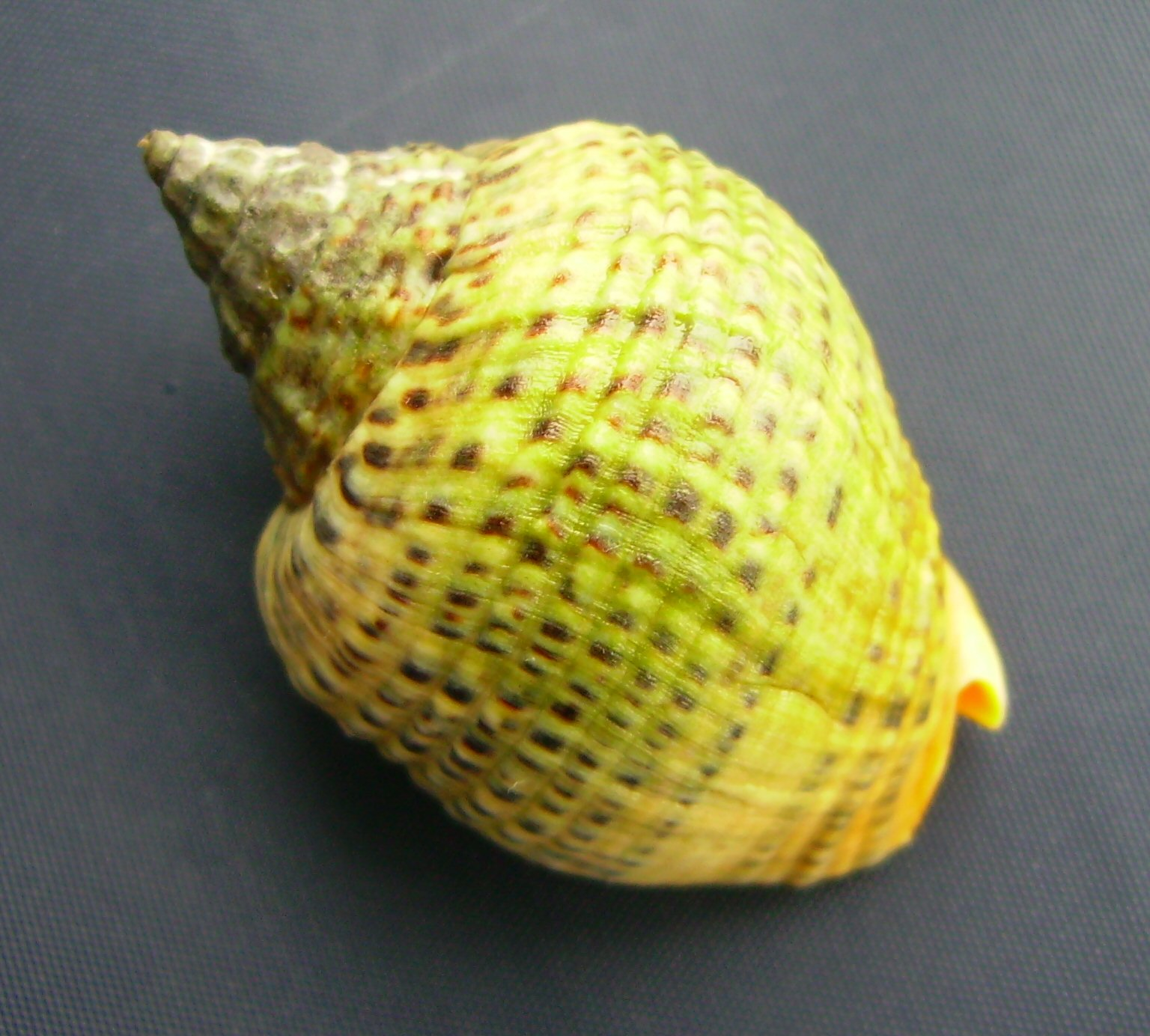
Dorsal view

== Distribution ==
Cominella adspersa is endemic to New Zealand and is found along the coast of North Island, northern South Island, and the Chatham Islands.

== Habitat ==
The species inhabits the mid to low tidal zone and can be found at depth of up to 20m.
