= Pareuthria chlorotica =

Scientific classification
- Kingdom: Animalia
- Phylum: Mollusca
- Class: Gastropoda
- Subclass: Caenogastropoda
- Order: Neogastropoda
- Family: Cominellidae
- Genus: Pareuthria
- Species: P. chlorotica

Binomial name
- Pareuthria chlorotica (Martens, 1878)

Synonyms
- Euthria chlorotica (Martens, 1878) (original combination)

Species of gastropod

Pareuthria chlorotica is a species of sea snail, a marine gastropod mollusk in the family Cominellidae.

== Distribution ==
This marine species occurs off Kerguelen.
