= Cominella olsoni =

Scientific classification
- Kingdom: Animalia
- Phylum: Mollusca
- Class: Gastropoda
- Subclass: Caenogastropoda
- Order: Neogastropoda
- Family: Cominellidae
- Genus: Cominella
- Species: C. olsoni

Binomial name
- Cominella olsoni (Dell, 1956)

Synonyms
- Eucominia olsoni Dell, 1956

Species of gastropod

Cominella olsoni is a species of predatory sea snail, a marine gastropod mollusc in the family Cominellidae, the true whelks.
