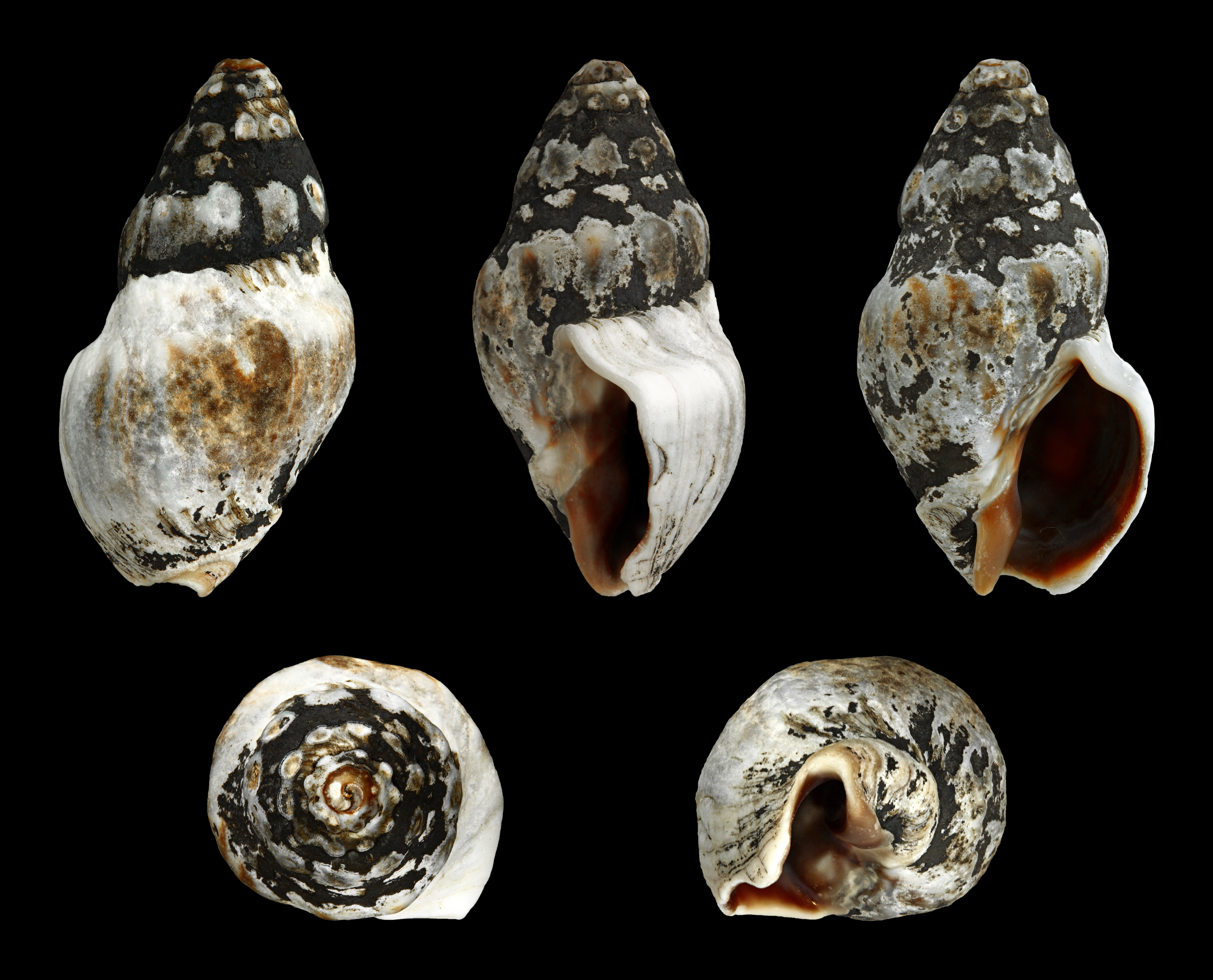

Scientific classification
- Kingdom: Animalia
- Phylum: Mollusca
- Class: Gastropoda
- Subclass: Caenogastropoda
- Order: Neogastropoda
- Family: Cominellidae
- Genus: Cominella
- Species: C. glandiformis

Binomial name
- Cominella glandiformis (Reeve, 1847)

= Cominella glandiformis =

Species of gastropod

Cominella glandiformis, the mud whelk or mud-flat whelk, is a species of predatory sea snail, a marine gastropod mollusc in the family Cominellidae. It is endemic to New Zealand.
