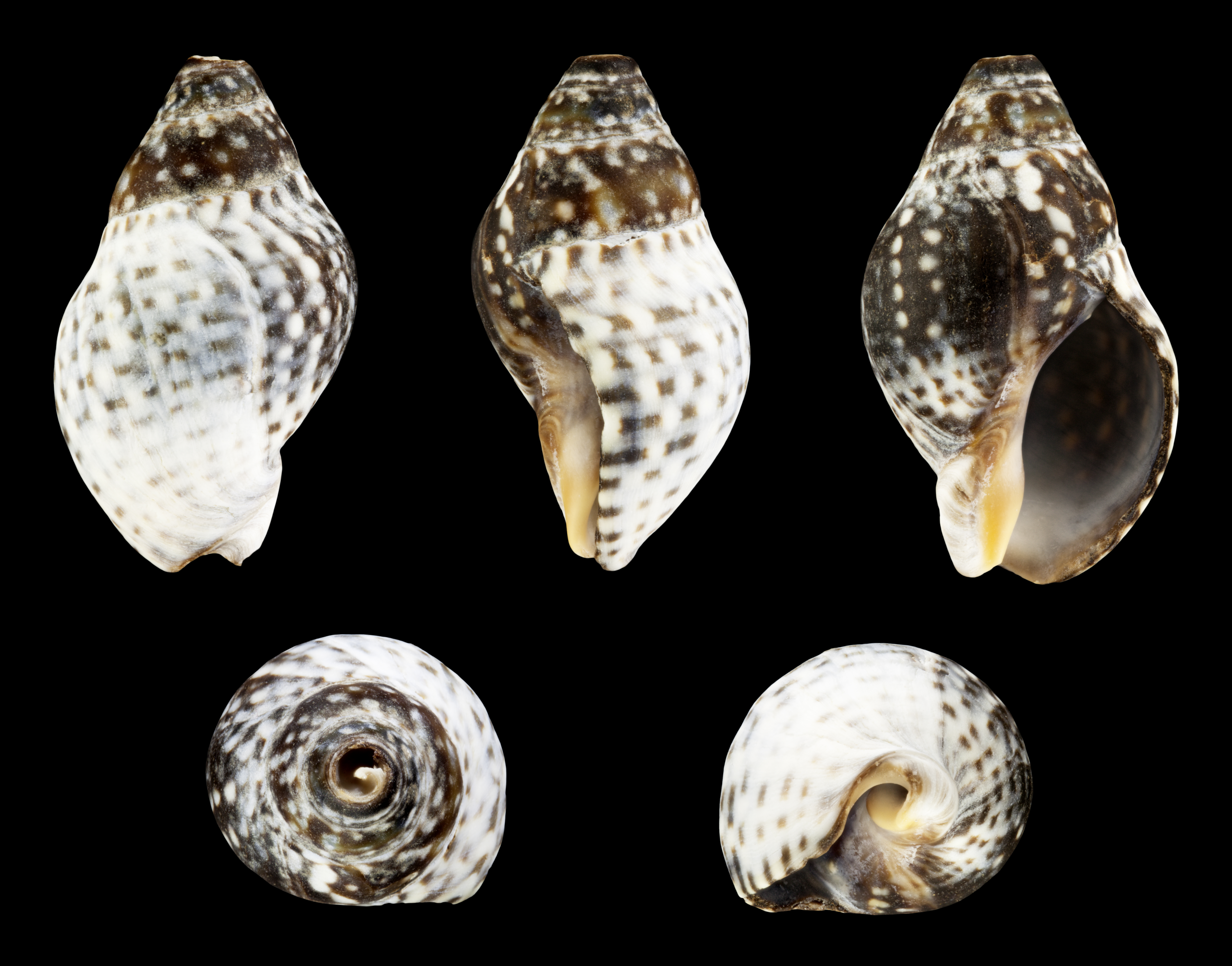

Scientific classification
- Kingdom: Animalia
- Phylum: Mollusca
- Class: Gastropoda
- Subclass: Caenogastropoda
- Order: Neogastropoda
- Family: Cominellidae
- Genus: Cominella
- Species: C. maculosa

Binomial name
- Cominella maculosa (Martyn, 1784)

Synonyms
- Buccinum maculosum Martyn, 1784; Buccinum testudineum Bruguière, 1789 (original combination); Cominella (Cominella) maculosa (Martyn, 1784) · accepted, alternate representation; Cominella testudinea (Bruguière, 1789)

= Cominella maculosa =

Species of mollusc

Cominella maculosa, common name the spotted whelk, is a species of predatory sea snail, a marine gastropod mollusc in the family Cominellidae, the true whelks.

== Description ==
The length of the shell varies between 30 mm and 45 mm.

The ovate, conical shell has a bluish ash color, traversed by distant lines, articulated and generally formed by oblong black points. The spots upon the upper whorls are larger, flamed, more or less numerous. The spire is composed of seven whorls. They are slightly convex, and united by a pretty fine and regular linear suture. The aperture is oblong ovate, slightly longitudinal, smooth and of a chamois-yellow color. The outer lip is thin and sharp.

== Distribution ==
This marine species is endemic to New Zealand and is found off the North Island, the north part of the South Island and the Chatham Islands. This species inhabits mid to low tidal zones, to 16 m depth.
