= Pareuthria plicatula =

Scientific classification
- Kingdom: Animalia
- Phylum: Mollusca
- Class: Gastropoda
- Subclass: Caenogastropoda
- Order: Neogastropoda
- Family: Cominellidae
- Genus: Pareuthria
- Species: P. plicatula

Binomial name
- Pareuthria plicatula Thiele, 1912

Species of gastropod

Pareuthria plicatula is a species of sea snail, a marine gastropod mollusc in the family Cominellidae.
