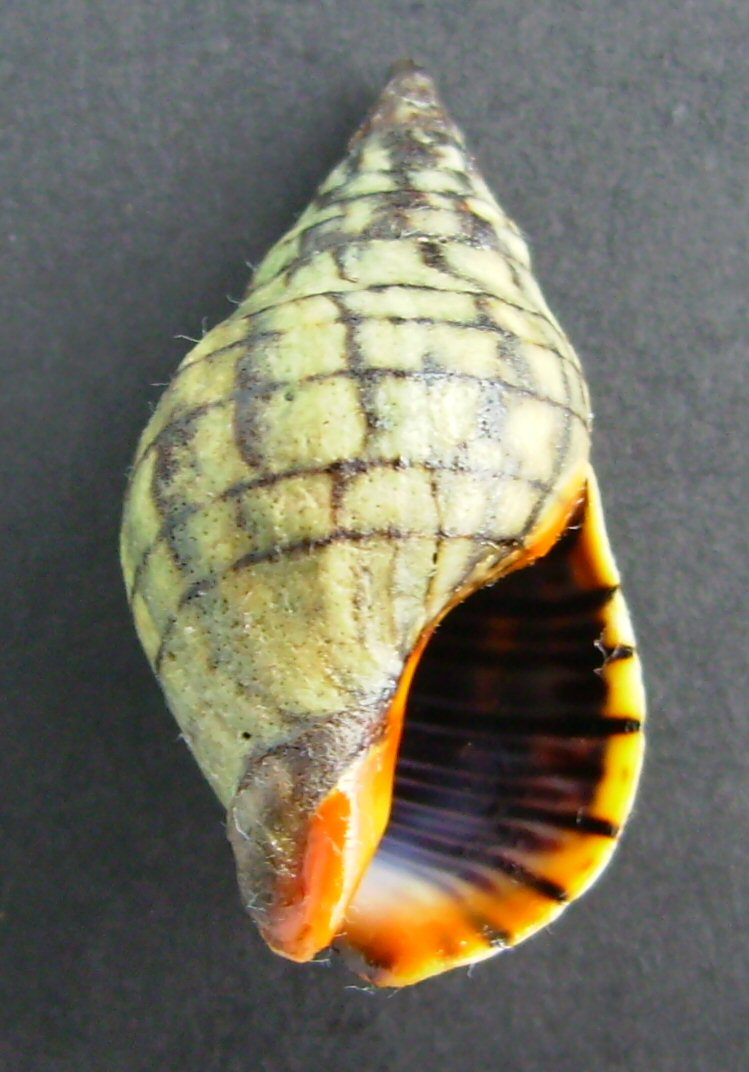

Scientific classification
- Kingdom: Animalia
- Phylum: Mollusca
- Class: Gastropoda
- Subclass: Caenogastropoda
- Order: Neogastropoda
- Family: Cominellidae
- Genus: Cominella
- Species: C. virgata

Binomial name
- Cominella virgata H. Adams and A. Adams, 1853

Synonyms
- Buccinum lineolatum Quoy & Gaimard, 1833 (Homonym and synonym); Cominella (Cominula) virgata H. Adams & A. Adams, 1853· accepted, alternate representation; Cominella (Cominula) virgata brookesi Powell, 1952· accepted, alternate representation; Cominella (Josepha) virgata H. Adams & A. Adams, 1853; Cominella virgata virgata H. and A. Adams, 1853; Cominella virgata brookesi Powell, 1952

= Cominella virgata =

Species of gastropod

Cominella virgata is a species of predatory sea snail, a marine gastropod mollusc in the family Cominellidae.

== Distribution ==
This marine species is endemic to New Zealand.

== Taxonomy ==
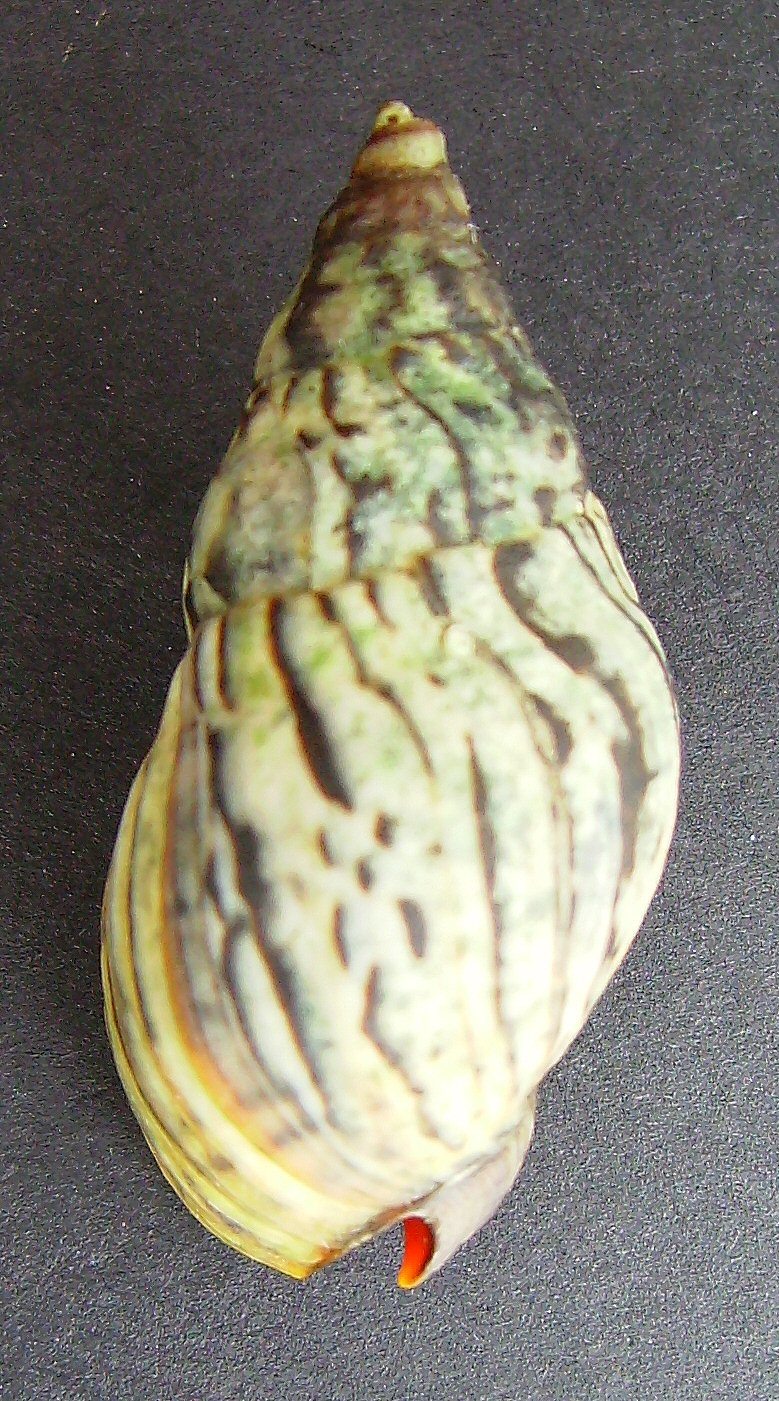
Dorsal view of a Cominella virgata shell.

A subspecies, Cominella virgata brookesi Powell, 1952 was formerly recognized, but the taxon was demonstrated to be genetically indistinguishable from C. virgata virgata.

== Habitat ==
This species inhabits the mid to low tidal zones and prefers areas where there is less sediment. It can be observed in tide pools, sheltering in crevices or underneath rocks. It has an affinity for Neptune's Necklace and Coralline algae species.
