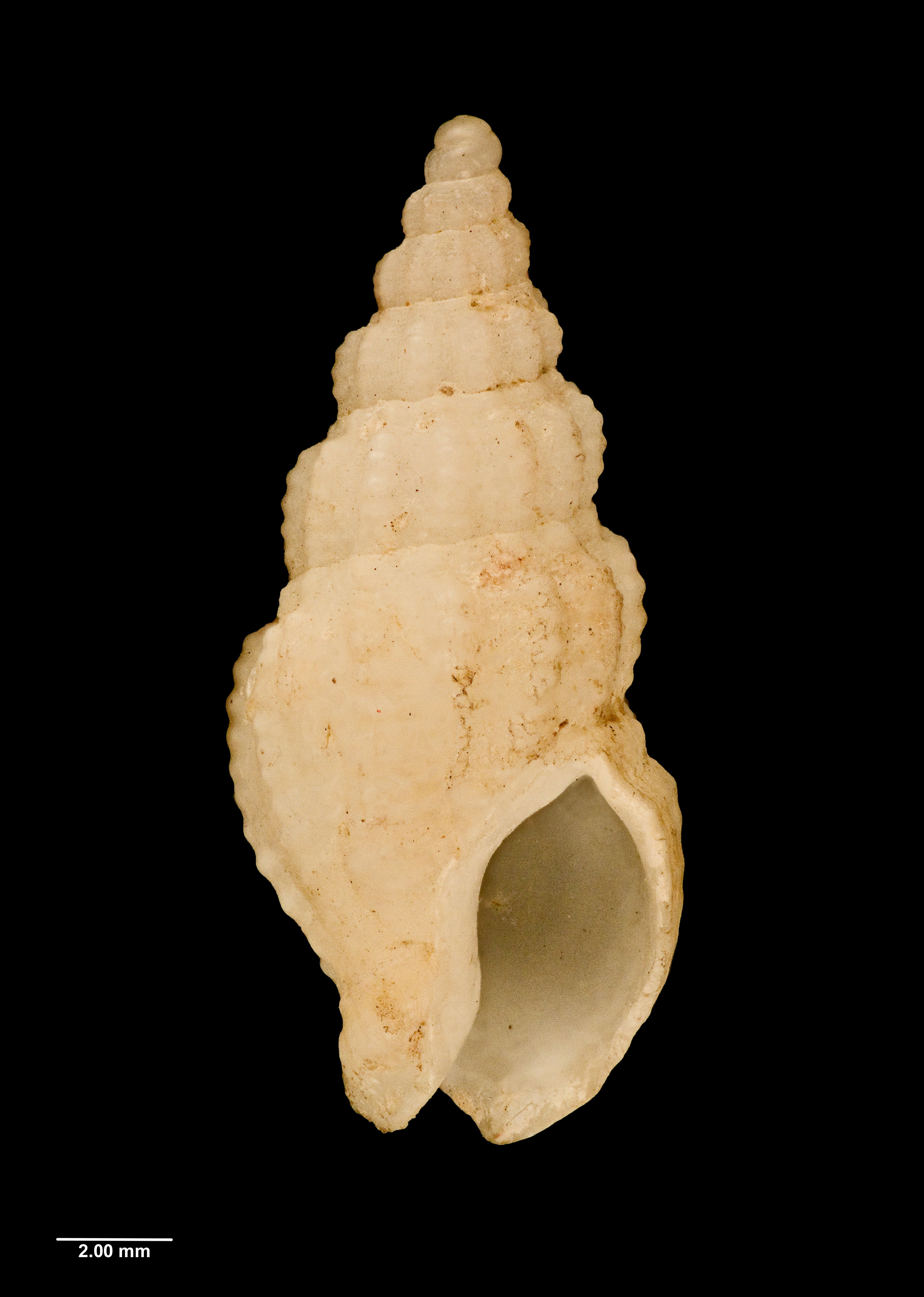
- Shell of Cominella otagoensis (specimen at the Auckland War Memorial Museum)

Scientific classification
- Kingdom: Animalia
- Phylum: Mollusca
- Class: Gastropoda
- Subclass: Caenogastropoda
- Order: Neogastropoda
- Family: Cominellidae
- Genus: Cominella
- Species: C. otagoensis

Binomial name
- Cominella otagoensis (Finlay, 1927)

Synonyms
- Cominella (Eucominia) otagoensis (Finlay, 1926)· accepted, alternate representation; Zephos otagoensis Finlay, 1927

= Cominella otagoensis =

Species of gastropod

Cominella otagoensis is a species of predatory sea snail, a marine gastropod mollusc in the family Cominellidae, the true whelks.

== Distribution ==
This marine species is endemic to New Zealand.
