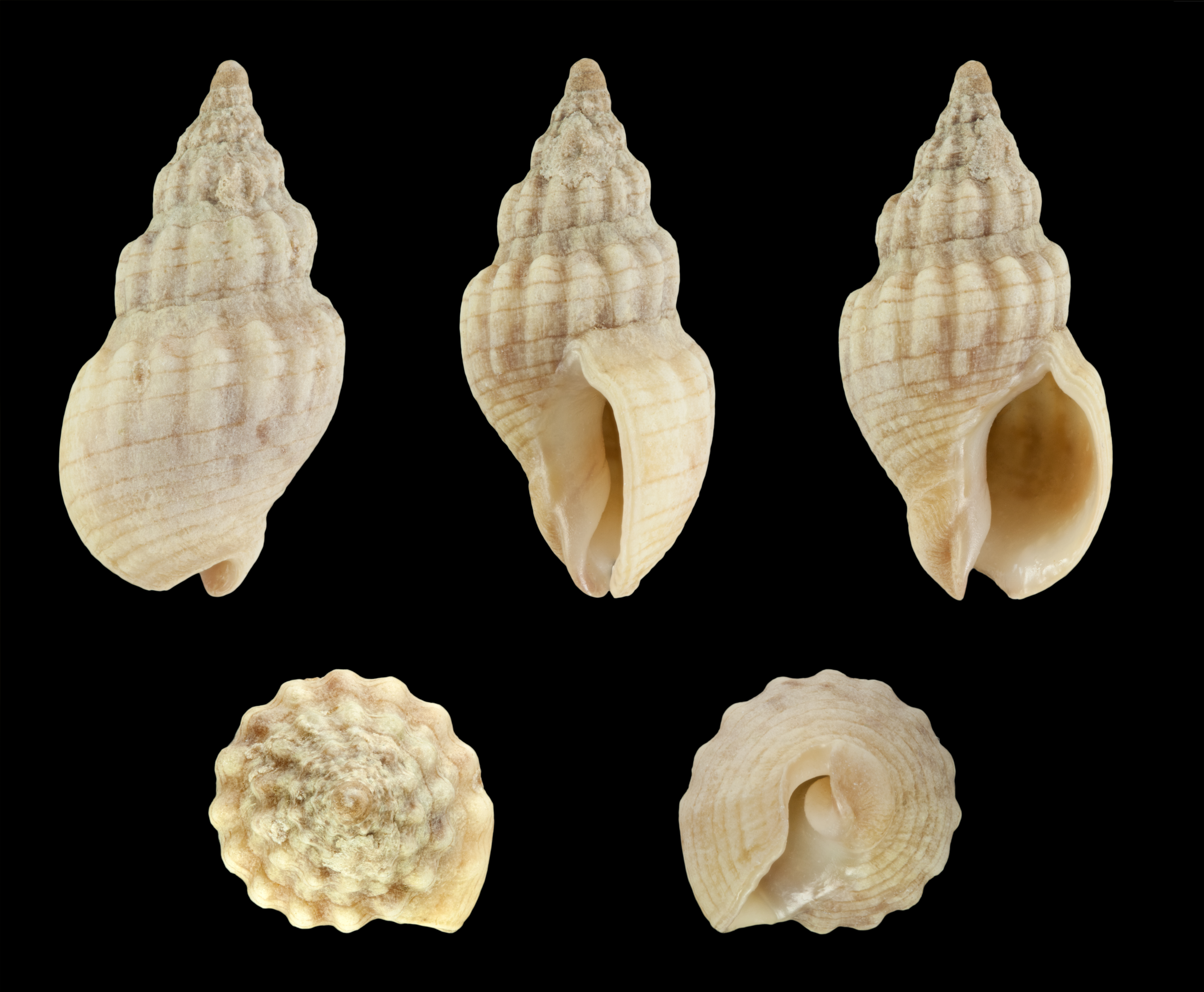
- A shell of Cominella quoyana

Scientific classification
- Kingdom: Animalia
- Phylum: Mollusca
- Class: Gastropoda
- Subclass: Caenogastropoda
- Order: Neogastropoda
- Family: Cominellidae
- Genus: Cominella
- Species: C. quoyana

Binomial name
- Cominella quoyana A. Adams, 1854

Synonyms
- Buccinum luridum Hutton, 1873 (Invalid: not B. luridum Philippi, 1849); † Cominella (Cominula) kempi Powell, 1934; Cominella (Cominula) quoyana A. Adams, 1855· accepted, alternate representation; Cominella (Josepha) quoyana A. Adams, 1855; Cominella (Josepha) quoyana quoyana A. Adams, 1855; Cominella huttoni Kobelt, 1878; Cominella quoyana quoyana A. Adams, 1855

= Cominella quoyana =

Species of gastropod

Cominella quoyana is a species of predatory sea snail, a marine gastropod mollusc in the family Cominellidae.

== Subspecies ==
- Cominella quoyana accuminata (Hutton, 1893): synonym of Cominella accuminata Hutton, 1893
- Cominella quoyana griseicalx (Willian, 1978): synonym of Cominella griseicalx Willan, 1978
- Cominella quoyana necopinata (Finlay, 1930): synonym of Cominella necopinata (Finlay, 1930)
