= Cominella alertae =

Scientific classification
- Kingdom: Animalia
- Phylum: Mollusca
- Class: Gastropoda
- Subclass: Caenogastropoda
- Order: Neogastropoda
- Family: Cominellidae
- Genus: Cominella
- Species: C. alertae

Binomial name
- Cominella alertae (Dell, 1956)

Synonyms
- Fax alertae Dell, 1956

Species of gastropod

Cominella alertae is a species of predatory deepwater sea snail, a marine gastropod mollusc in the family Cominellidae.
