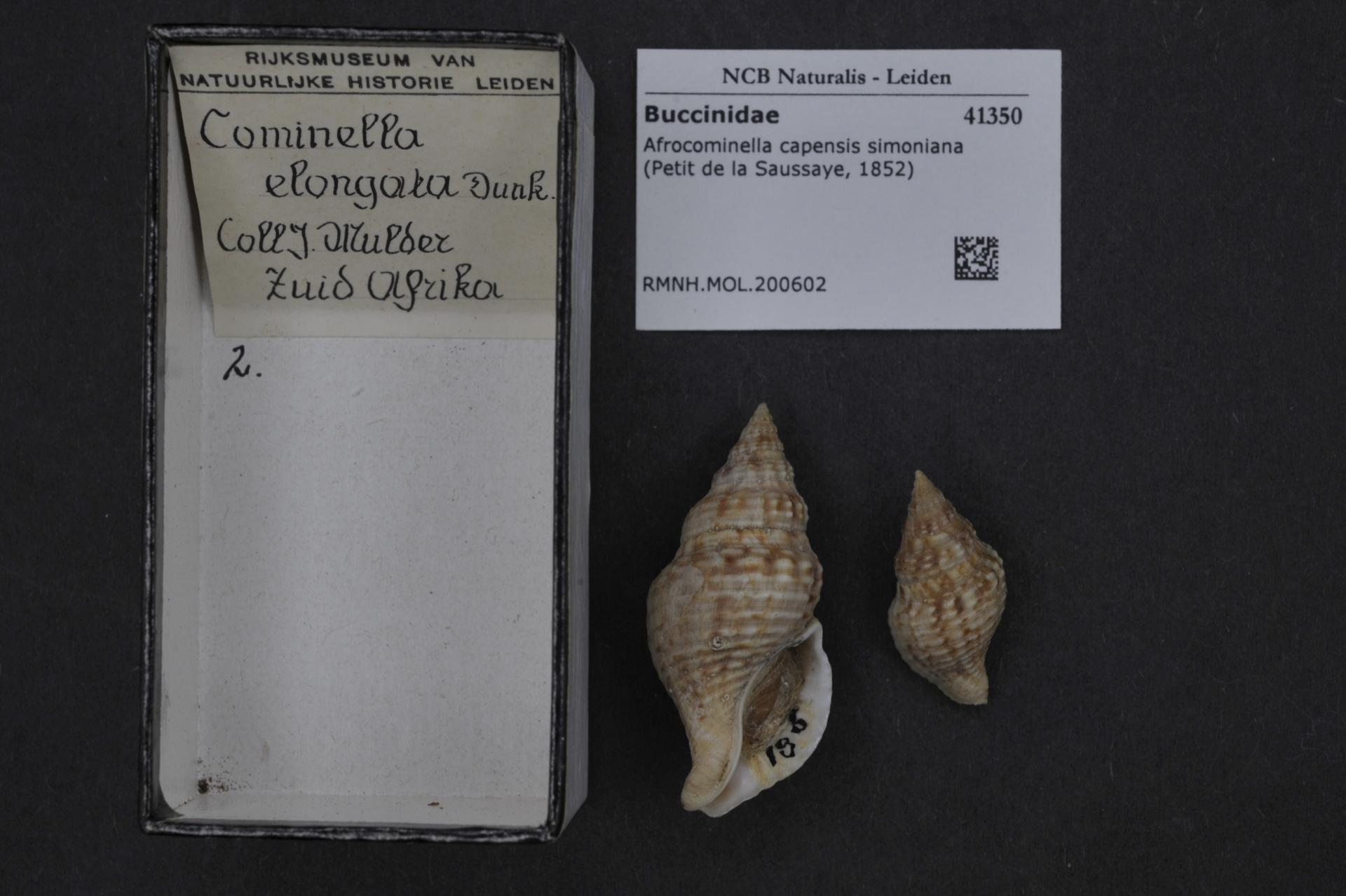
- Afrocominella capensis shells

Scientific classification
- Kingdom: Animalia
- Phylum: Mollusca
- Class: Gastropoda
- Subclass: Caenogastropoda
- Order: Neogastropoda
- Superfamily: Buccinoidea
- Family: incertae sedis
- Genus: Afrocominella; Iredale, 1918

Type species
- Cominella elongata (Dunker, 1857)

Species
- See text

= Afrocominella =

Genus of gastropods

Afrocominella is a genus of sea snails, marine gastropod mollusks in the superfamily Buccinoidea.

== Species ==
Species within the genus Afrocominella include:

- Afrocominella capensis (Dunker in Philippi, 1844)
- Afrocominella turtoni (Bartsch, 1915)

Species brought into synonymy

- Afrocominella elongata: synonym of Afrocominella capensis simoniana (Petit de la Saussaye, 1852)
- Afrocominella multistriata (Turton, 1932): synonym of Afrocominella capensis simoniana (Petit de la Saussaye, 1852)
