= Buccinaria guacoldae =

Scientific classification
- Kingdom: Animalia
- Phylum: Mollusca
- Class: Gastropoda
- Subclass: Caenogastropoda
- Order: Neogastropoda
- Superfamily: Conoidea
- Family: Raphitomidae
- Genus: Buccinaria
- Species: B. guacoldae

Binomial name
- Buccinaria guacoldae C. Nielsen, 2003

Extinct species of gastropod

Buccinaria guacoldae is an extinct species of sea snail, a marine gastropod mollusk in the family Raphitomidae.

== Distribution ==
Fossils of this marine species were found in Miocene strata of Navidad Formation, Chile.
