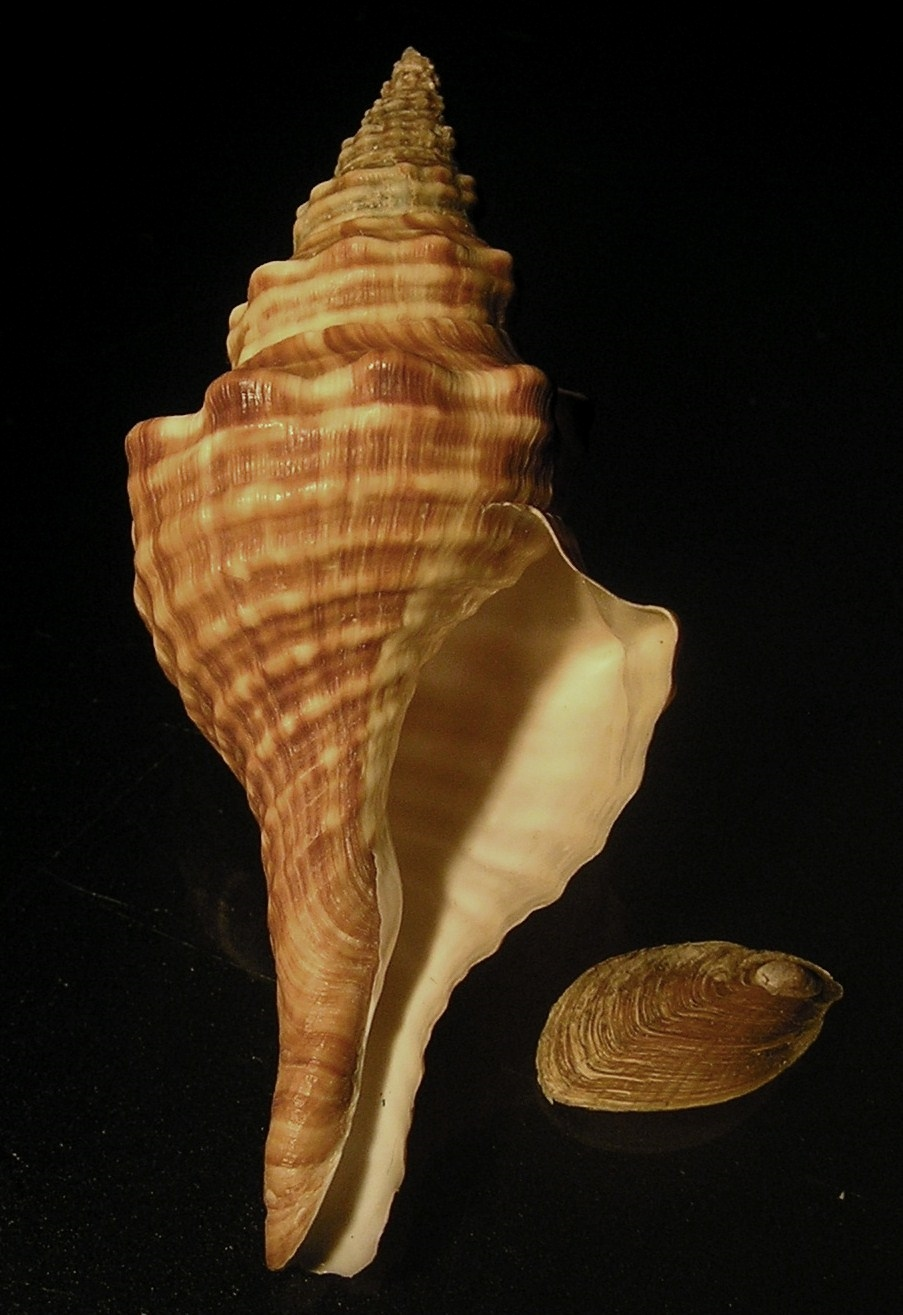
- Shell of Africofusus ocellifer

Scientific classification
- Kingdom: Animalia
- Phylum: Mollusca
- Class: Gastropoda
- Subclass: Caenogastropoda
- Order: Neogastropoda
- Superfamily: Buccinoidea
- Family: Fasciolariidae
- Genus: Africofusus; Vermeij & Snyder, 2018

Type species
- Fusus ocelliferus Lamarck, 1816

= Africofusus =

Genus of gastropods

Africofusus is a genus of sea snails, marine gastropod mollusks in the family Fasciolariidae, the spindle snails, the tulip snails and their allies.

== Species ==
Species within the genus Africofusus include:

- Africofusus adamsii (Kobelt, 1880)
- Africofusus africanus (G. B. Sowerby III, 1897)
- Africofusus cinnamomeus (Reeve, 1847)
- Africofusus ocelliferus (Lamarck, 1816)
- Africofusus robustior (G. B. Sowerby II, 1880)

Species brought into synonymy

- Africofusus ocellifer (Lamarck, 1816) accepted as Africofusus ocelliferus (Lamarck, 1816) (incorrect subsequent spelling of specific epithet)
