= Buccinaria martini =

Scientific classification
- Kingdom: Animalia
- Phylum: Mollusca
- Class: Gastropoda
- Subclass: Caenogastropoda
- Order: Neogastropoda
- Superfamily: Conoidea
- Family: Raphitomidae
- Genus: Buccinaria
- Species: B. martini

Binomial name
- Buccinaria martini (Koperberg, 1931)

Synonyms
- Ootoma martini Koperberg, 1931 (original combination); Pionotoma pyrum Kuroda, 1952

Species of gastropod

Buccinaria martini is a species of sea snail, a marine gastropod mollusk in the family Raphitomidae.

== Description ==
The length of the shell attains 38.8 mm.

== Distribution ==
This marine species occurs off the Philippines and Japan.
