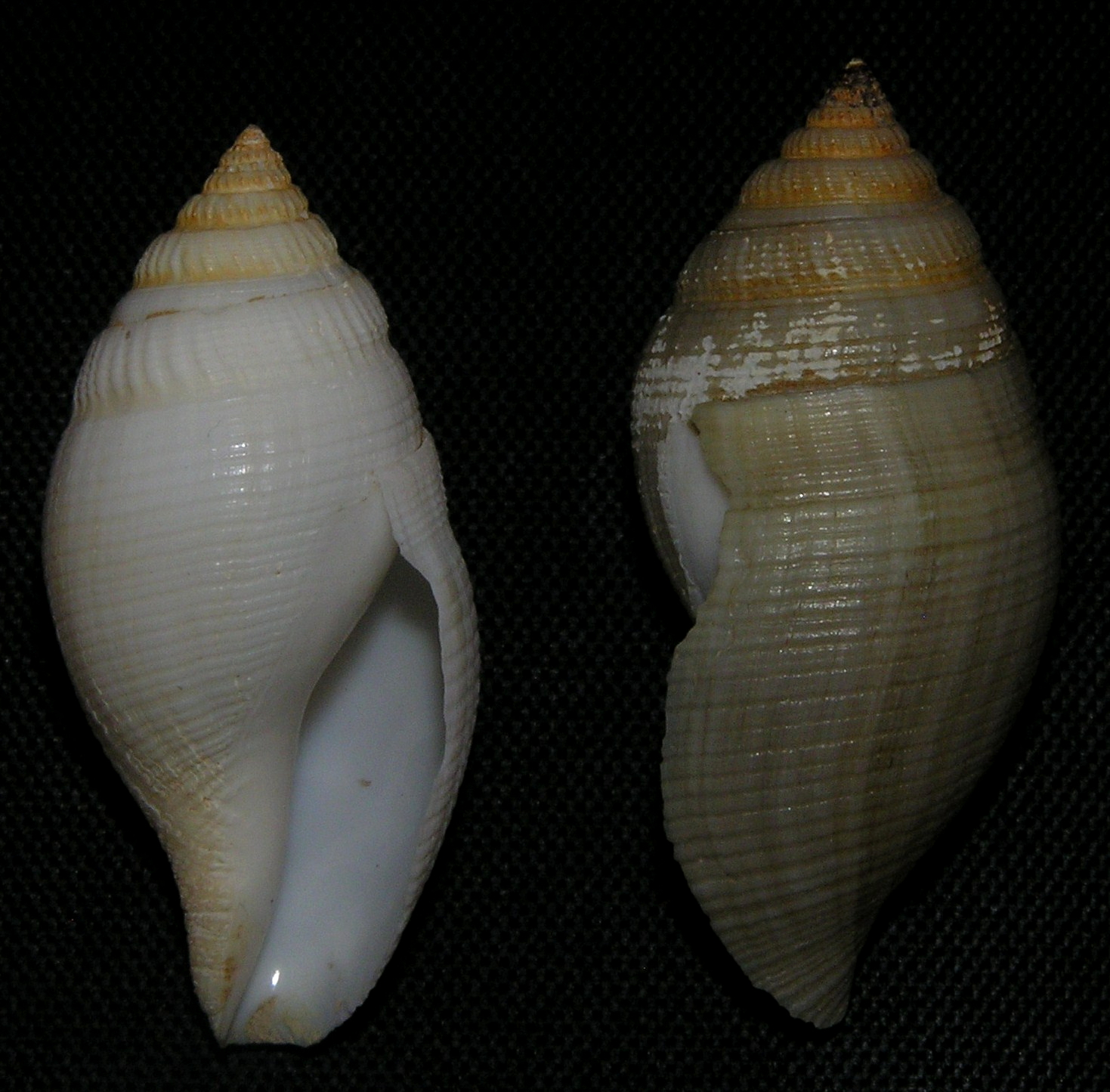
- Shells of Buccinaria jonkeri

Scientific classification
- Kingdom: Animalia
- Phylum: Mollusca
- Class: Gastropoda
- Subclass: Caenogastropoda
- Order: Neogastropoda
- Superfamily: Conoidea
- Family: Raphitomidae
- Genus: Buccinaria; Kittl, 1887

Type species
- Buccinaria hoheneggeri Kittl, 1887

Species
- See text

Synonyms
- Ootoma Koperberg, 1931 ( Invalid: junior homonym of Ootoma Dejean, 1833 and Ootoma Blanchard, 1850; Ootomella Bartsch, 1933; Pionotoma Kuroda, 1952

= Buccinaria =

Genus of gastropods

Buccinaria is a genus of sea snails, marine gastropod mollusks in the family Raphitomidae.

== Species ==
Species within the genus Buccinaria include:

- † Buccinaria guacoldae Nielsen, 2003
- † Buccinaria hoheneggeri Kittl, 1887
- Buccinaria jonkeri (Koperberg, 1931)
- Buccinaria loochooensis MacNeil, 1961
- Buccinaria martini (Koperberg, 1931)
- Buccinaria nodosa Morassi & Bonfitto, 2010
- † Buccinaria okinawa MacNeil, 1960
- Buccinaria pendula Bouchet & Sysoev, 1997
- Buccinaria pygmaea Bouchet & Sysoev, 1997
- Buccinaria urania (Smith E. A., 1906)

There are also many extinct species from Tertiary strata in Europe and Eastern Asia.

Species brought into synonymy

- Buccinaria abbreviata (Schepman, 1913): synonym of Acanthodaphne abbreviata (Schepman, 1913)
- Buccinaria javanensis van Regteren Altena, 1950: synonym of Buccinaria urania (E. A. Smith, 1906)
- Buccinaria koperbergi Martin, 1933: synonym of Buccinaria jonkeri (Koperberg, 1931)
- Buccinaria retifera Martin, 1933: synonym of Buccinaria jonkeri (Koperberg, 1931)
- Buccinaria teramachii (Kuroda, 1952): synonym of Buccinaria jonkeri (Koperberg, 1931)
