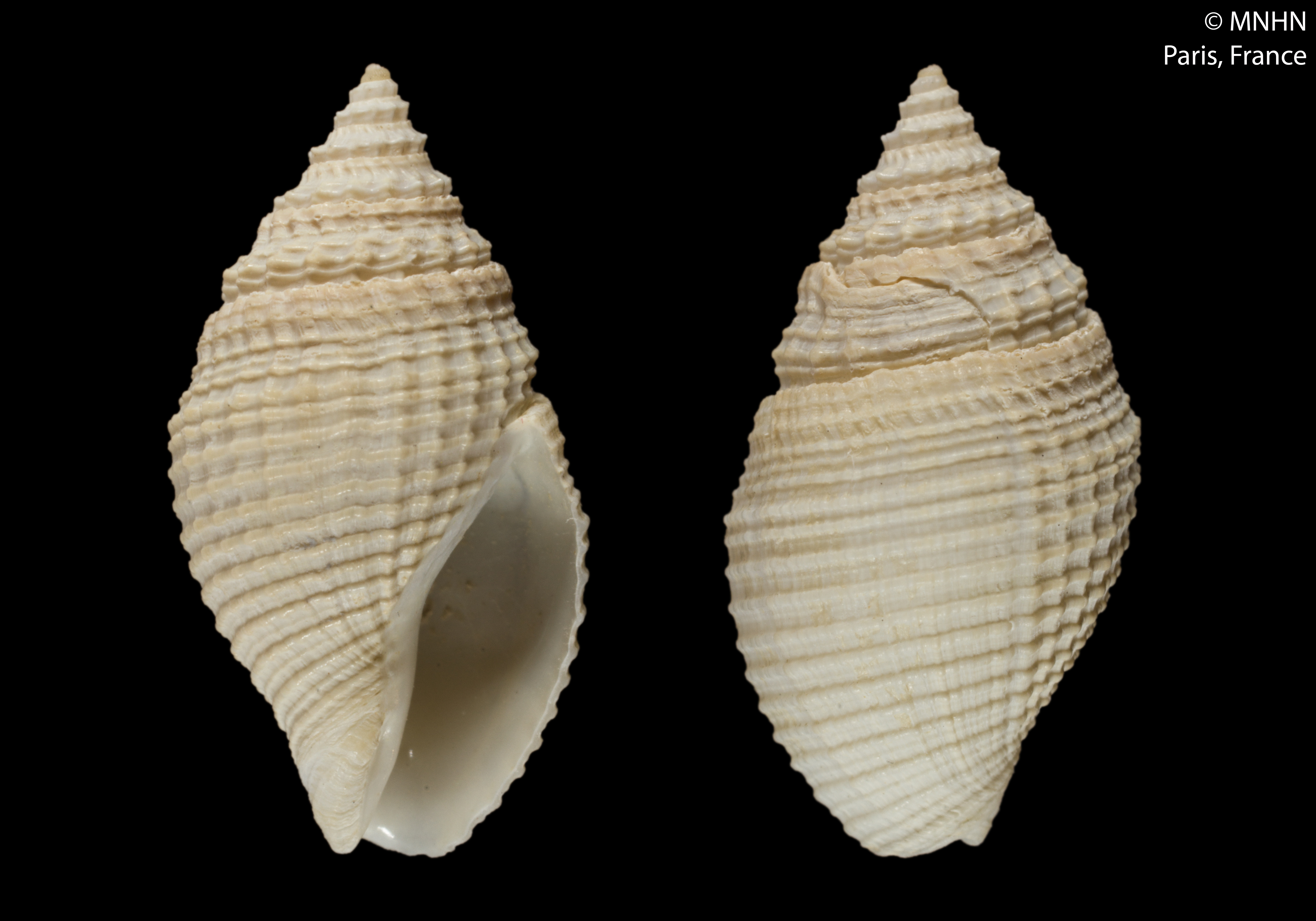

Scientific classification
- Kingdom: Animalia
- Phylum: Mollusca
- Class: Gastropoda
- Subclass: Caenogastropoda
- Order: Neogastropoda
- Superfamily: Conoidea
- Family: Raphitomidae
- Genus: Buccinaria
- Species: B. pygmaea

Binomial name
- Buccinaria pygmaea Bouchet & Sysoev, 1997

= Buccinaria pygmaea =

Species of gastropod

Buccinaria pygmaea is a species of sea snail, a marine gastropod mollusk in the family Raphitomidae.

== Distribution ==
This marine species occurs off New Caledonia.
