= Buccinaria urania =

Scientific classification
- Kingdom: Animalia
- Phylum: Mollusca
- Class: Gastropoda
- Subclass: Caenogastropoda
- Order: Neogastropoda
- Superfamily: Conoidea
- Family: Raphitomidae
- Genus: Buccinaria
- Species: B. urania

Binomial name
- Buccinaria urania (E.A. Smith, 1906)

Synonyms
- Buccinaria javanensis van Regteren Altena, 1950; Pleurotoma urania E. A. Smith, 1906 (original combination)

Species of gastropod

Buccinaria urania is a species of sea snail, a marine gastropod mollusk in the family Raphitomidae.

== Description ==
The length of the shell attains 23 mm, its diameter 11 mm.

The white ovately fusiform shell contains 10 whorls. In some of the upper whorls the upper margin just beneath the suture is also more or less nodose. The tubercles just above the suture are crossed by two or three sulci, so that each of them is tripartite or quadripartite. The oblong aperture has a sharp angle above and a narrow gutterlike, slightly recurved siphonal canal below. The outer lip is thin, the upper part gently curving.

== Distribution ==
This marine species occurs off Southeast India, the Andamans and off the Philippines.
