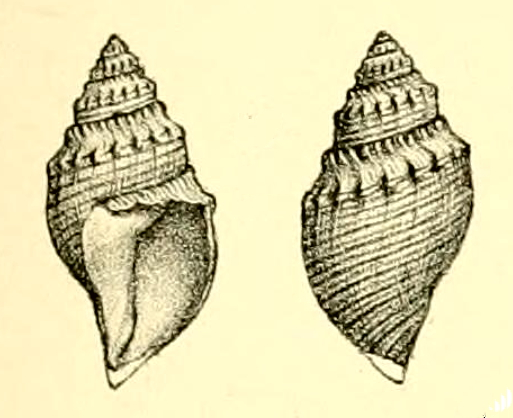
- Original image of a shell of † Buccinaria hoheneggeri

Scientific classification
- Kingdom: Animalia
- Phylum: Mollusca
- Class: Gastropoda
- Subclass: Caenogastropoda
- Order: Neogastropoda
- Family: Raphitomidae
- Genus: Buccinaria
- Species: †B. hoheneggeri

Binomial name
- †Buccinaria hoheneggeri (M. Hörnes, 1861)

Synonyms
- † Fusus hoheneggeri M. Hörnes, 1861

= Buccinaria hoheneggeri =

Extinct species of sea snail

Buccinaria hoheneggeri is an extinct species of sea snail, a marine gastropod mollusk in the family Raphitomidae.

== Description ==
(Original description in German) In its main form, the shell is similar to a Buccinum. A short, wide-open siphonal canal is present. The shell angle 35-50°, the smaller whorls are the blunter ones (the shell angle is thus different depending on the whorl being considered). The aperture is elongate-oval, constricted above, quite wide open below. The outer lip is sharpened, the inner lip smooth and callous.

The sculpture of the shell is predominantly longitudinal. With the exception of a smooth sutural band enclosed by two rows of nodules, which is only occasionally interrupted by stronger growth folds, the body whorl is decorated with 12-14 shallow, channel-like striae, of which mostly 1-2 already extend beyond the lower half of the lower row of nodules; as a rule, the channels, like the raised bands lying between them, are simple; in a few specimens, the individual channels are doubled, i.e., divided by a fine raised line. The growth lines are weak, inversely S-shaped curved, and are generally fine. In some specimens, individual stronger growth ridges protrude. The two rows of nodules mentioned above are formed by swellings of the respective growth lines. The upper nodules, located at the suture, are 1.5-3 times as long as wide (shorter in the smaller whorls, longer in the larger ones) and are present in double the number of the lower, usually much stronger nodules. In individual old specimens, these two rows of nodules sometimes almost completely disappear on the body whorl (the lower, stronger one first); as a rule, however, this disappearance of the nodule rows only occurs in individual growth zones. As a special variety, one can group together those specimens that show the tendency of the nodules to weaken at a very young stage.

== Distribution ==
Fossils of this marine species were found in Miocene strata in Austria
