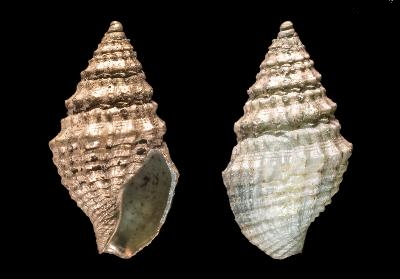
- Shell of Buccinaria nodosa (holotype at MNHN, Paris)

Scientific classification
- Kingdom: Animalia
- Phylum: Mollusca
- Class: Gastropoda
- Subclass: Caenogastropoda
- Order: Neogastropoda
- Superfamily: Conoidea
- Family: Raphitomidae
- Genus: Buccinaria
- Species: B. nodosa

Binomial name
- Buccinaria nodosa Morassi & Bonfitto, 2010

= Buccinaria nodosa =

Species of gastropod

Buccinaria nodosa is a species of sea snail, a marine gastropod mollusk in the family Raphitomidae.

== Description ==
The length of the shell attains 5.8 mm.

== Distribution ==
This marine species occurs off the Solomon Islands and Papua New Guinea.
