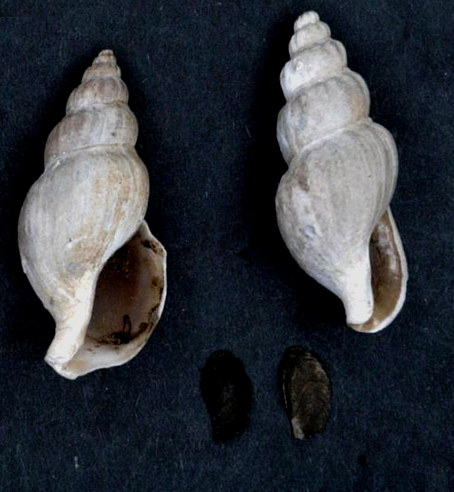
- Two shells of Pareuthria fuscata with their operculum (museum specimens of Naturalis Biodiversity Center)

Scientific classification
- Kingdom: Animalia
- Phylum: Mollusca
- Class: Gastropoda
- Subclass: Caenogastropoda
- Order: Neogastropoda
- Family: Cominellidae
- Genus: Pareuthria
- Species: P. fuscata

Binomial name
- Pareuthria fuscata (Bruguière, 1789)

Synonyms
- Buccinum antarcticum Reeve, 1846; Buccinum campbelli Filhol, 1880; Buccinum fuscatum Bruguière, 1789 (basionym); Buccinum magellanicum Philippi, 1849; Buccinum patagonicum Philippi, 1845; Euthria fuscata (Bruguière, 1789); Fusus hombroni Philippi, 1855; Fusus plumbeus Philippi, 1844; Fusus rufus Hombron & Jacquinot, 1848 (invalid: junior homonym of Fusus rufus Brown, 1827; F. hombroni is a replacement name); Pareuthria campbelli (Filhol, 1880); Pareuthria fuscata var. curta Preston, 1913; Pareuthria magellanica (Philippi, 1849); Pareuthria plumbea (Philippi, 1844); Tritonium schwartzianum Crosse, 1861

= Pareuthria fuscata =

Species of gastropod

Pareuthria fuscata is a species of sea snail, a marine gastropod mollusk in the family Cominellidae.

== Description ==
The size of the shell varies between 25 mm and 45 mm.

The ovate, conical shell is smooth and reddish brown. The spire is composed of six whorls, whose length slightly exceeds that of the aperture. The whorls of the spire are convex, bent obliquely at the suture, and marked in that part by slightly projecting and distant longitudinal folds. The body whorl is partially free of these, and those perceptible there, are only slightly obvious on the upper half of the side of the aperture. The aperture is ovate and smooth. The lips are a whitish, clear fawn-color, but the depth of the cavity presents the same tint as the exterior. It is narrower towards the base, where it terminates by a shallow emargination, the edges of which are slightly curved towards the back. The outer lip is simple, sharp upon the edge and effuse. It has, towards its upper part, an oblique fold, which seems to widen the aperture and partially forms the obtuse angle. The columella is almost straight, shining, and of a livid color.

== Distribution ==
This marine species occurs off the Falklands; in the Strait of Magellan; in Antarctic waters.
