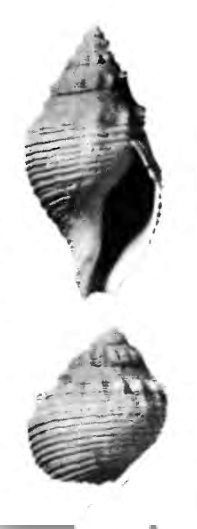
- Original image of a shell of Buccinaria okinawa

Scientific classification
- Kingdom: Animalia
- Phylum: Mollusca
- Class: Gastropoda
- Subclass: Caenogastropoda
- Order: Neogastropoda
- Superfamily: Conoidea
- Family: Raphitomidae
- Genus: Buccinaria
- Species: B. okinawa

Binomial name
- Buccinaria okinawa F.S. MacNeil, 1960

= Buccinaria okinawa =

Extinct species of gastropod

Buccinaria okinawa is an extinct species of sea snail, a marine gastropod mollusk in the family Raphitomidae.

== Description ==
The length of the shell attains 15.5 mm, its diameter 8 mm.

(Original description) The shell is of medium size. It is inflated with the spire shorter than the aperture. The whorls are subcarinate to subrounded. The protoconch is small, conical and pointed, consisting of 2½ whorls ornamented with fine, diagonally cancellate or "sinusigerid" sculpture. The aperture is rather broad and forms a broad short siphonal canal anteriorly. The outer lip is thin, gently curving, and narrowly indented to form a weak anal sinus along the subsutural slope. The parietal callus is weak with the sculpture on the lower part of the whorls partly dissolved with the advance of the callus. The sculpture consists of axial nodes along the periphery which flatten out rapidly both above and below the periphery, those of the young stages being sharp and denticulate. The shell is covered by raised spiral lines which are finer and more closely set above the periphery but broader and more widely spaced towards the base of the whorl. The interspaces on the lower part of the whorl bear secondary and even tertiary threads.

== Distribution ==
Fossils of this marine species were found in Miocene strata in Okinawa
