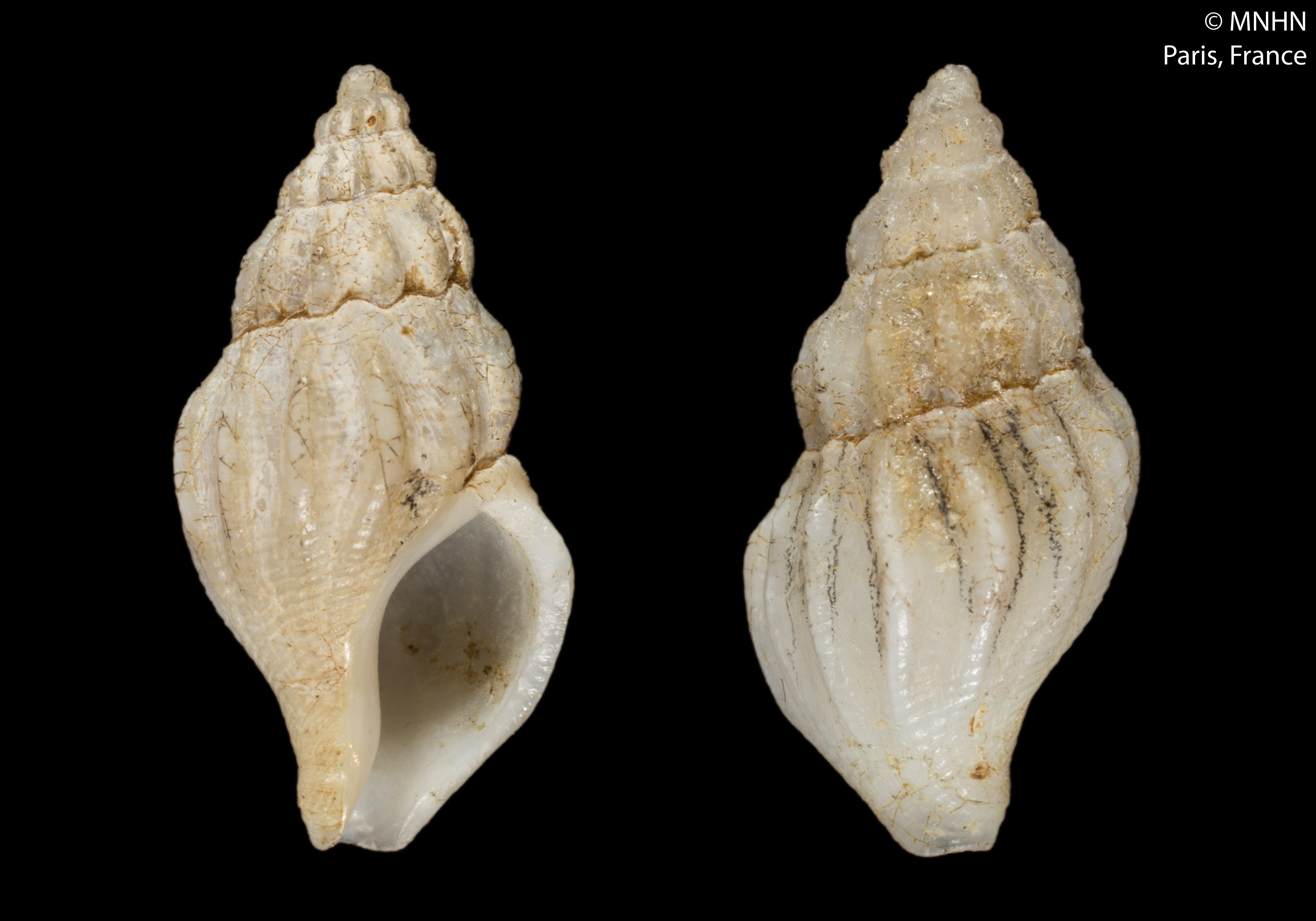
- Shell of Pareuthria atrata

Scientific classification
- Kingdom: Animalia
- Phylum: Mollusca
- Class: Gastropoda
- Subclass: Caenogastropoda
- Order: Neogastropoda
- Superfamily: Buccinoidea
- Family: Cominellidae
- Genus: Pareuthria; Strebel, 1905

Type species
- Fusus plumbeus Philippi, 1844

Synonyms
- Euthria (Pareuthria) Strebel, 1905

= Pareuthria =

Genus of gastropods

Pareuthria is a genus of sea snails, marine gastropod mollusks in the family Cominellidae.

== Distribution ==
Species of Pareuthria are found in waters off of New Zealand and Argentina.

== Evolution ==
Pareuthria is related to the genus Cominella found in New Zealand and Australia. Pareuthria is currently recognised within the family Cominellidae but it has also previously been referred to the alternative families Buccinulidae and Buccinidae.

== Species ==
Species within the genus Pareuthria include:

- Pareuthria atrata (E. A. Smith, 1881)
- Pareuthria chlorotica (Martens, 1878)
- Pareuthria fuscata (Bruguière, 1789)
- Pareuthria guzmani Poppe & Tagaro, 2026
- Pareuthria janseni (Strebel, 1905)
- Pareuthria plicatula Thiele, 1912
- Pareuthria regulus (Watson, 1882)
- Pareuthria rosea (Hombron & Jacquinot, 1854)
- Pareuthria turriformis Egorova, 1982
- Pareuthria valdiviae (Thiele, 1925)
- Pareuthria venustula Strebel, 1905

Species brought into synonymy

- Pareuthria campbelli (Filhol, 1880): synonym of Pareuthria fuscata (Bruguière, 1789)
- Pareuthria cerealis (Rochebrunne & Mabille, 1885): synonym of Argeneuthria cerealis (Rochebrune & Mabille, 1885)
- Pareuthria hoshiaii Numanami, 1996: synonym of Falsimohnia hoshiaii (Numanami, 1996)
- Pareuthria innocens (Smith, 1907): synonym of Falsimohnia innocens (E. A. Smith, 1907)
- Pareuthria magellanica (Phillippi, 1848): synonym of Pareuthria fuscata (Bruguière, 1789)
- Pareuthria michaelseni (Strebel, 1905): synonym of Microdeuthria michaelseni (Strebel, 1905)
- Pareuthria paessleri (Strebel, 1905): synonym of Argeneuthria paessleri (Strebel, 1905)
- Pareuthria philippii (Strebel, 1905): synonym of Argeneuthria philippii (Strebel, 1905)
- Pareuthria plumbea (Philippi, 1844): synonym of Pareuthria fuscata (Bruguière, 1789)
- Pareuthria powelli Cernohorsky, 1977: synonym of Pareuthria atrata (E. A. Smith, 1881)
- Pareuthria ringei (Strebel, 1905): synonym of Pareuthria atrata (E. A. Smith, 1881)
