= Buccinaria loochooensis =

Scientific classification
- Kingdom: Animalia
- Phylum: Mollusca
- Class: Gastropoda
- Subclass: Caenogastropoda
- Order: Neogastropoda
- Superfamily: Conoidea
- Family: Raphitomidae
- Genus: Buccinaria
- Species: B. loochooensis

Binomial name
- Buccinaria loochooensis MacNeil, 1961

Synonyms
- Buccinaria (Ootomella) loochooensis F.S. MacNeil, 1961

Species of gastropod

Buccinaria loochooensis is a species of sea snail, a marine gastropod mollusk in the family Raphitomidae.

== Description ==
The length of the shell attains 29.7 mm, its diameter 12.6 mm.

== Distribution ==
This species was originally described from Neogene strata in the Ryukyu Islands, later from Pliocene strata in Okinawa. Recent specimens were found off Borneo, Luzon Island, the Philippines and in the Celebes Sea, Indonesia.
