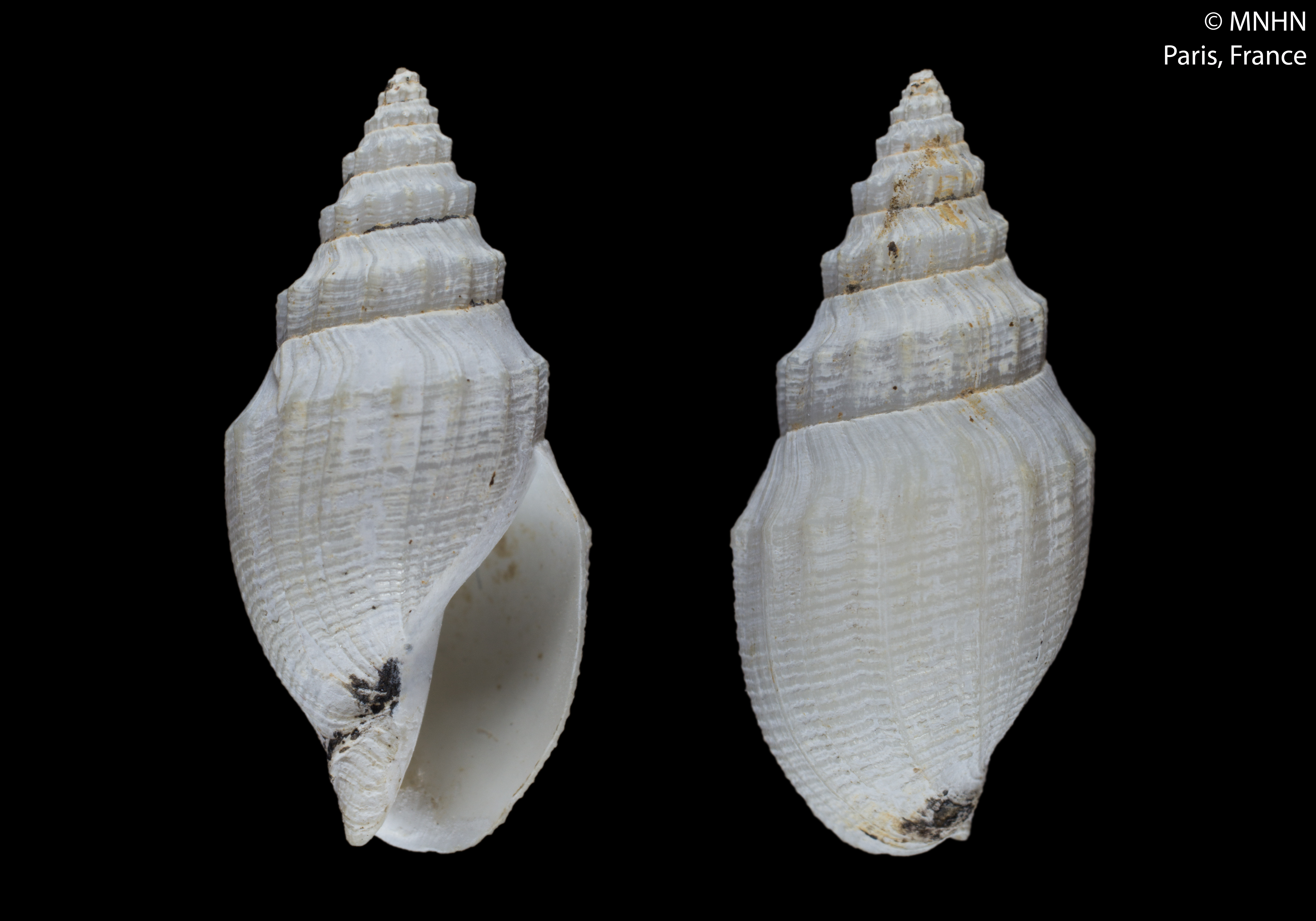

Scientific classification
- Kingdom: Animalia
- Phylum: Mollusca
- Class: Gastropoda
- Subclass: Caenogastropoda
- Order: Neogastropoda
- Superfamily: Conoidea
- Family: Raphitomidae
- Genus: Buccinaria
- Species: B. pendula

Binomial name
- Buccinaria pendula Bouchet & Sysoev, 1997

= Buccinaria pendula =

Species of gastropod

Buccinaria pendula is a species of sea snail, a marine gastropod mollusk in the family Raphitomidae.

== Description ==
The length of the shell attains 8 mm.

== Distribution ==
This marine species occurs off the Philippines.
