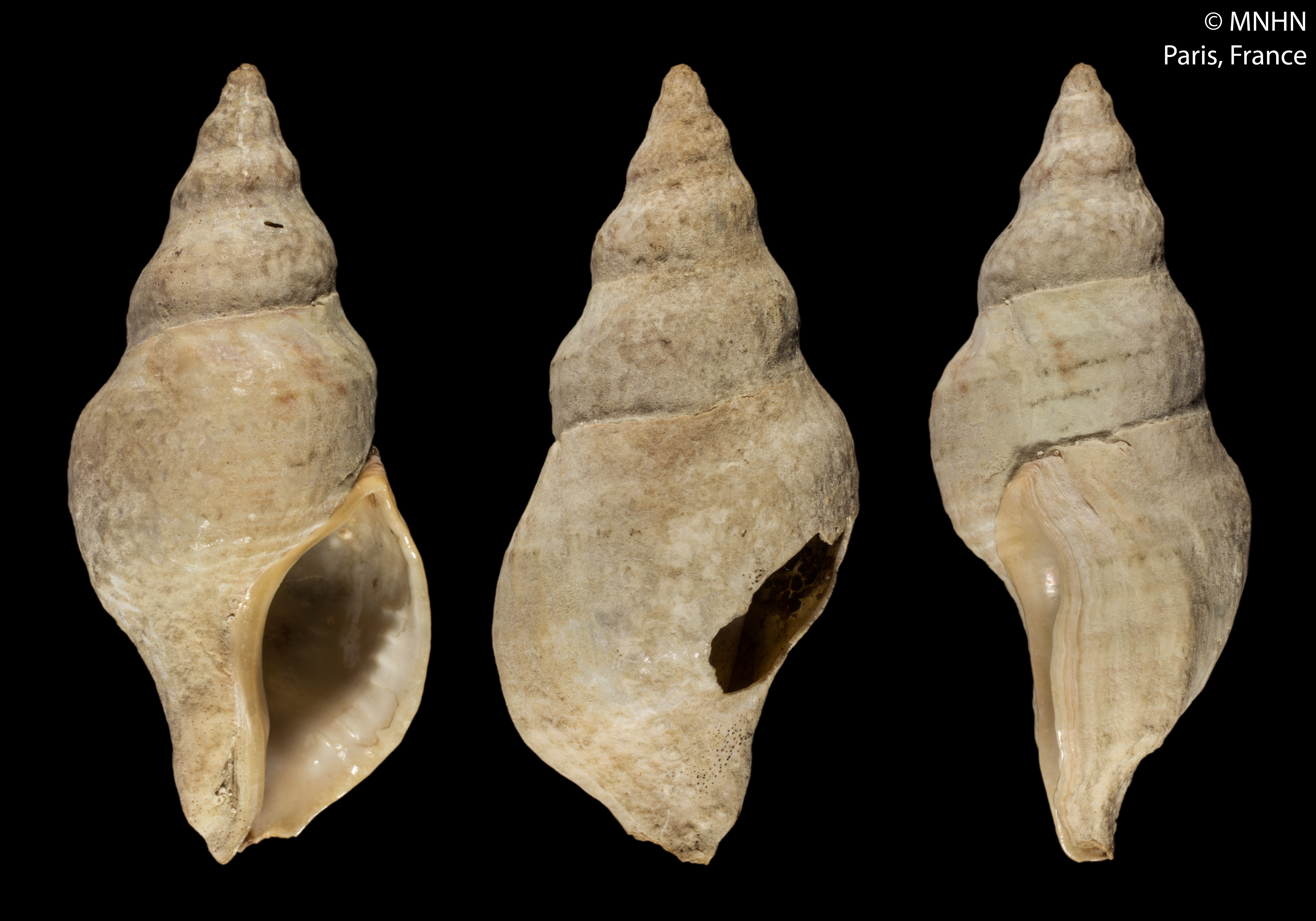
- Afrocominella capensis shells (syntype at MNHN, Paris)

Scientific classification
- Kingdom: Animalia
- Phylum: Mollusca
- Class: Gastropoda
- Subclass: Caenogastropoda
- Order: Neogastropoda
- Family: incertae sedis
- Genus: Afrocominella
- Species: A. capensis

Binomial name
- Afrocominella capensis (Dunker in Philippi, 1844)

Synonyms
- Afrocominella elongata (Dunker, 1857); Cominella elongata Dunker, 1857; Afrocominella capensis capensis (Dunker in Philippi, 1844)· accepted, alternate representation; Cominella capensis (Dunker in Philippi, 1844); Euthria lacertina Gould, 1860; Fusus capensis Dunker in Philippi, 1844 (original combination)

= Afrocominella capensis =

Species of gastropod

Afrocominella capensis, common name the elongate whelk, is a species of sea snail, a marine gastropod mollusc unassigned in the superfamily Buccinoidea.

Subspecies

- Afrocominella capensis capensis (Dunker in Philippi, 1844) (synonyms: Euthria lacertina Gould, 1860; Fusus capensis Dunker in Philippi, 1844 (basionym) )
- Afrocominella capensis simoniana (Petit de la Saussaye, 1852) (synonyms: Afrocominella elongata (Dunker, 1857); Afrocominella multistriata (Turton, 1932); Cominella alfredensis Bartsch, 1915; Cominella elongata (Dunker, 1857); Euthria multistriata Turton, 1932; Euthria simoniana Petit, 1852; Fusus simonianus Petit de la Saussaye, 1852 (basionym); Glypteuthria solidissima Tomlin, 1932)

== Description ==
The length is up to 40 mm, but shallow-water form is longer.

(Description of Afrocominella capensis capensis) The shell is spindle-shaped to biconic, with proportions that vary. Deep-water specimens tend to be less elongate. The whorls are shouldered, featuring distinct spiral cords and low axial ribs near the shoulder, giving it a somewhat nodular appearance. In mature specimens, the outer lip is thickened and internally ridged, while the siphonal canal is short.

(Description of Afrocominella capensis simoniana) The shell is fusiform and flesh-colored, with varying mottles and dashes of brown. The whorls of the protoconch are decollated, while the post-nuclear whorls feature a sloping shoulder that extends across the posterior three-fifths of the whorls between the sutures. These are marked by weak axial ribs, most prominent at the anterior edge of the shoulder. Thirteen ribs are present on the body whorl, and fourteen on the preceding one.

The spiral sculpture comprises 10 irregular, low, broad cords. The three cords on the shoulder are nearly obsolete and barely visible, while the four on the base are fairly prominent. Additionally, the entire surface is adorned with fine, more or less regular punctate spiral striations. The posterior angle of the aperture is acute, and the outer lip bears nine slender denticles just inside the margin. The columella is glazed with a moderately strong callus, and the parietal lamellae are only slightly developed. Anteriorly, the axial ribs become significantly weaker.

== Distribution ==
This species is endemic to South Africa and is found off the Algulhas Bank, subtidal to 160 m.
