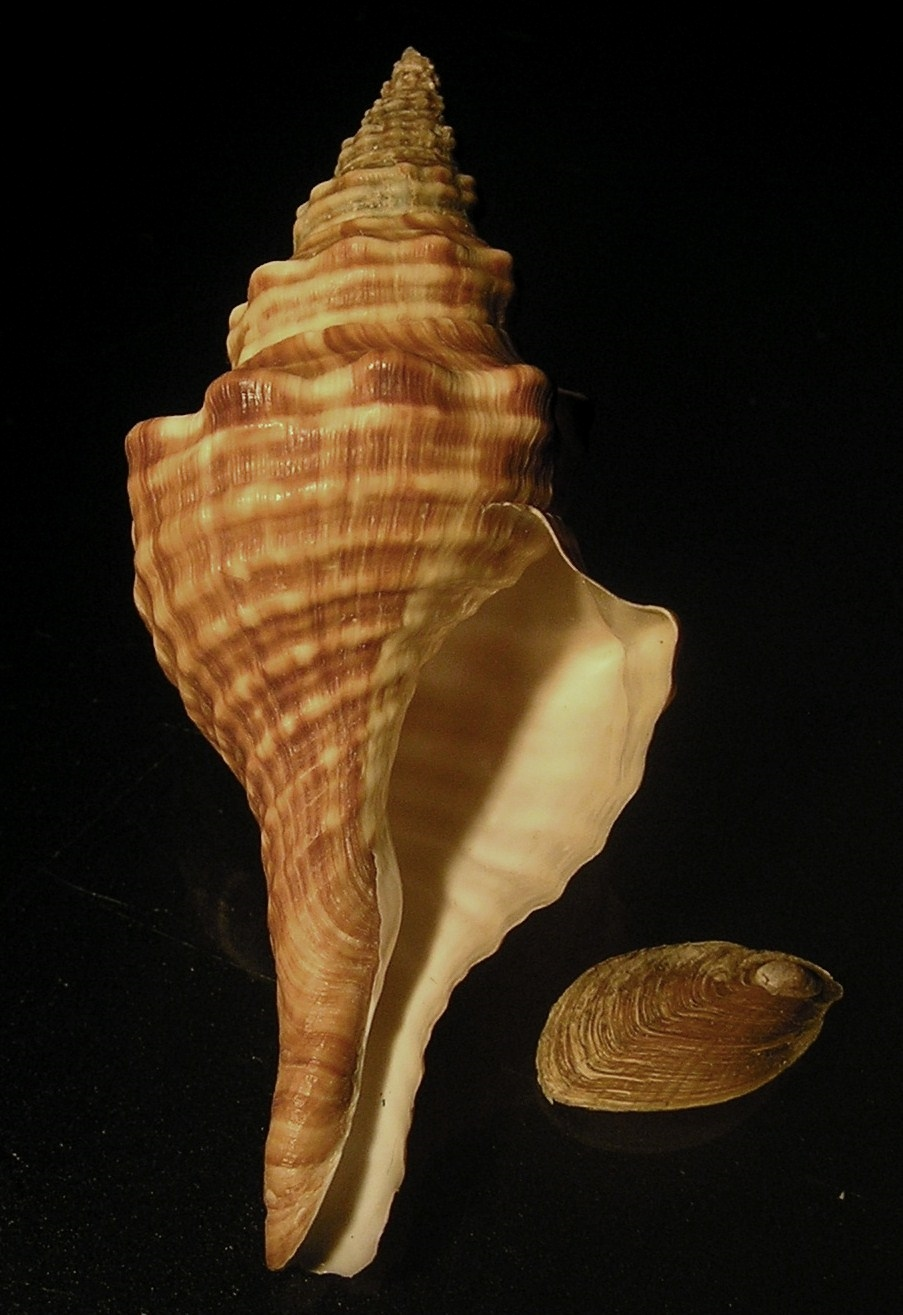
- Africofusus ocelliferus and operculum

Scientific classification
- Kingdom: Animalia
- Phylum: Mollusca
- Class: Gastropoda
- Subclass: Caenogastropoda
- Order: Neogastropoda
- Family: Fasciolariidae
- Genus: Africofusus
- Species: A. ocelliferus

Binomial name
- Africofusus ocelliferus (Lamarck, 1816)

Synonyms
- Africofusus ocellifer (Lamarck, 1816) (incorrect subsequent spelling of specific epithet); Cominella prolongata E. A. Smith, 1899; Fusinus adamsii Küster & Kobelt, 1876; Fusinus ocellifer [sic] (misspelling); Fusinus ocellifer f. adamsii Küster & Kobelt, 1876; Fusinus ocelliferus (Lamarck, 1816); Fusus adamsii Kobelt, 1876; Fusus cinnamomeus Reeve, 1847; Fusus crenulatus G. B. Sowerby II, 1880; Fusus ocellifer Lamarck, 1816; Fusus ocelliferus Lamarck, 1816 (original combination); Fusus robustior G. B. Sowerby II, 1880; Fusus rudolphi Dunker, 1871; Fusus ventricosus H. Adams, 1870; Fusus verruculatus Lamarck, 1822

= Africofusus ocelliferus =

Species of gastropod

Africofusus ocelliferus, common name the long-siphoned whelk, is a species of sea snail, a marine gastropod mollusk in the family Fasciolariidae, the spindle snails, the tulip snails and their allies.

== Spelling ==
The specific name was originally spelled "ocelliferus"; although this is not a correct latinization it is not liable to a justified emendation (cf. ICZN art. 32.5.1. "Incorrect transliteration or latinization ... are not to be considered inadvertent errors"). The spelling ocellifer is therefore an unjustified emendation, which may be traced to Kaicher, 1976 (card n^{o} 1857)

== Description ==
The length of the shell attains 160 mm.

The shell varies from narrowly to broadly spindle-shaped, with the spire comprising half to three-quarters of the total aperture length. The siphonal canal is long and slender, sometimes accounting for up to one-third of the total shell length, and is often slightly curved. The sculpture consists of coarse, flattened spiral ridges, though the prominence of these ridges varies widely between specimens. Some individuals display a distinct shoulder adorned with rounded nodules. A deep false umbilicus is often present beside the siphonal base in mature specimens. The inner lip lacks columellar pleats, and the interior of the outer lip is smooth.

The shell is whitish, with spiral ridges often spotted or mottled with brown. When present, the shoulder typically features darker brown spots, especially on the nodules. The periostracum is a velvety, horn-brown layer that often flakes off. The animal is orange-red.

== Distribution ==
This marine species is endemic to South Africa and occurs off Namaqualand, West coast to KwaZulu-Natal South coast; infratidal to 150 m, perhaps to 300 m.
