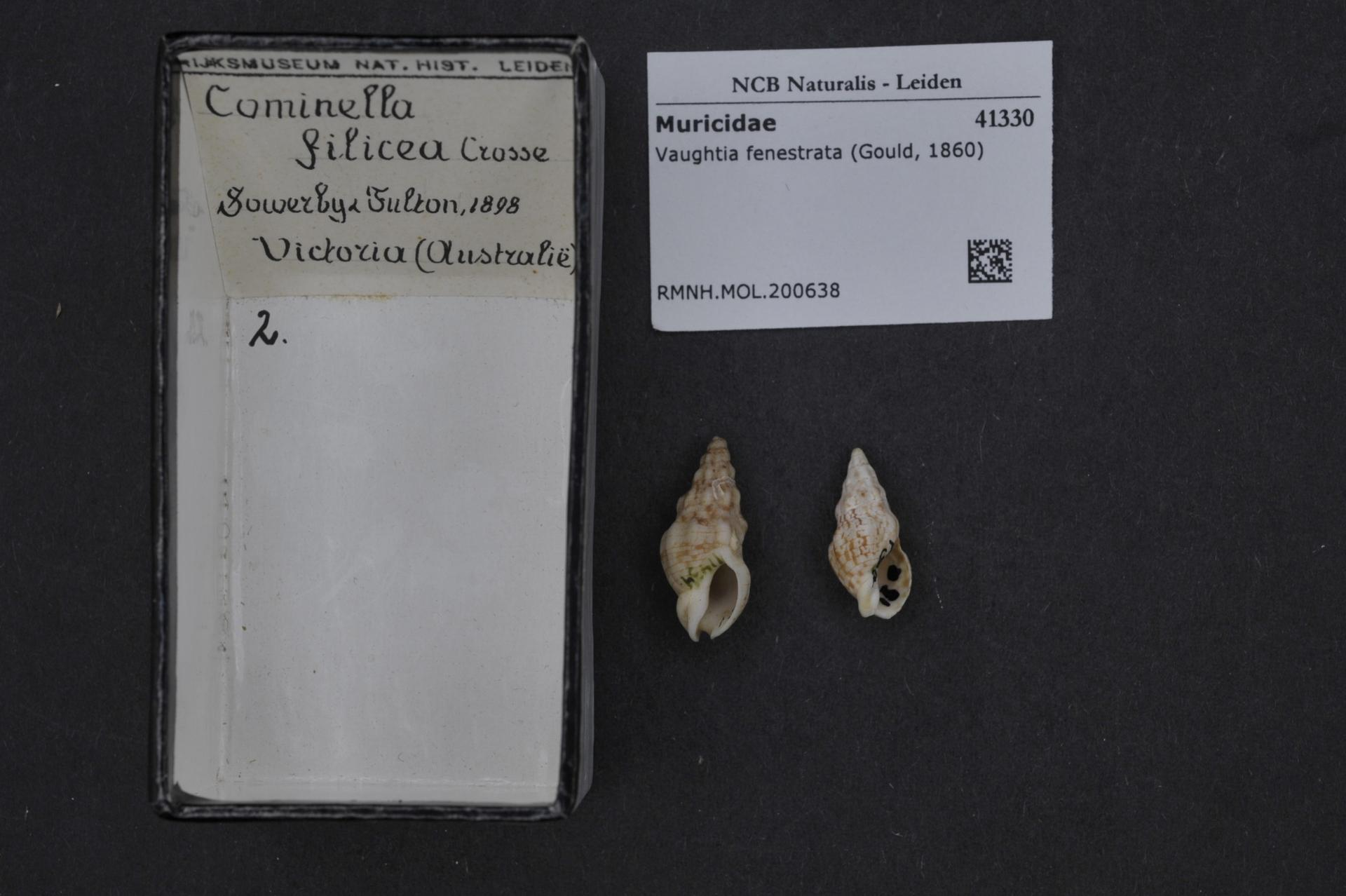
- Shell of Vaughtia fenestrata (specimen at Naturalis Biodiversity Center)

Scientific classification
- Kingdom: Animalia
- Phylum: Mollusca
- Class: Gastropoda
- Subclass: Caenogastropoda
- Order: Neogastropoda
- Family: Muricidae
- Genus: Vaughtia
- Species: V. fenestrata

Binomial name
- Vaughtia fenestrata (Gould, 1860)

Synonyms
- Cominella fuscopicta W. H. Turton, 1932 ·; Cominella puncturata G.B. Sowerby III, 1886; Cominella puncturata bipartita Turton, 1932; Fusus gracilis F C.L. Koch, 1845 · unaccepted; Ocenebra fenestrata (Gould, 1860); Peristernia fenestrata Gould, 1860; Tritonalia puncturata (G. B. Sowerby III, 1886)

= Vaughtia fenestrata =

Species of gastropod

Vaughtia fenestrata is a species of sea snail, a marine gastropod mollusk in the family Muricidae, the murex snails or rock snails.

== Description ==
The length of the shell attains 17 mm.

(Described as Cominella puncturata) The shell is elongated, rather thin, pale yellow, sometimes brown, with a pale band. The spire is elevated and acute. The six whorls are sloping above, then bi-angulated and spirally ribbed throughout. The ribs are numerous, but very slightly raised. The interstices are punctured. The body whorl is convex, scarcely angulated and attenuated below. The aperture is ovate and moderately wide. The siphonal canal is short and slightly recurved.

== Distribution ==
This marine species occurs off Jeffreys Bay, South Africa.
