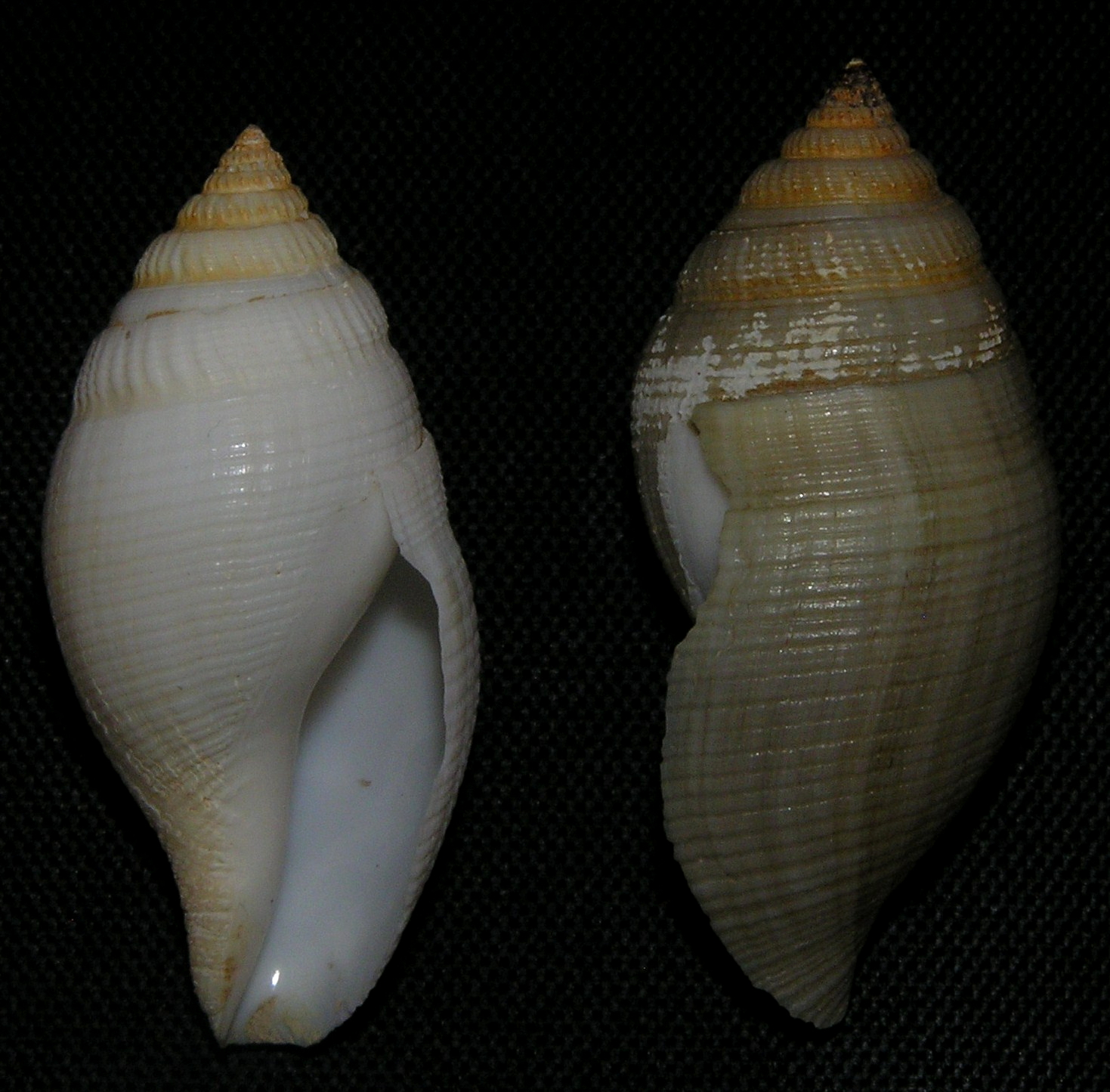
- Shells of Buccinaria jonkeri

Scientific classification
- Kingdom: Animalia
- Phylum: Mollusca
- Class: Gastropoda
- Subclass: Caenogastropoda
- Order: Neogastropoda
- Superfamily: Conoidea
- Family: Raphitomidae
- Genus: Buccinaria
- Species: B. jonkeri

Binomial name
- Buccinaria jonkeri (Koperberg, 1931)

Synonyms
- Buccinaria teramachii (Kuroda, 1952); Buccinaria koperbergi Martin, 1933; Buccinaria retifera Martin, 1933; Cominella koperbergi K. Martin, 1933; Cominella retifera K. Martin, 1933; Ootoma jonkeri Koperberg, 1931 (basionym); Pionotoma teramachii Kuroda, 1952

= Buccinaria jonkeri =

Species of gastropod

Buccinaria jonkeri is a species of sea snail, a marine gastropod mollusk in the family Raphitomidae.

== Description ==
The size of the white shell varies between 20 mm and 35 mm.

== Distribution ==
This marine species occurs off the Philippines.
