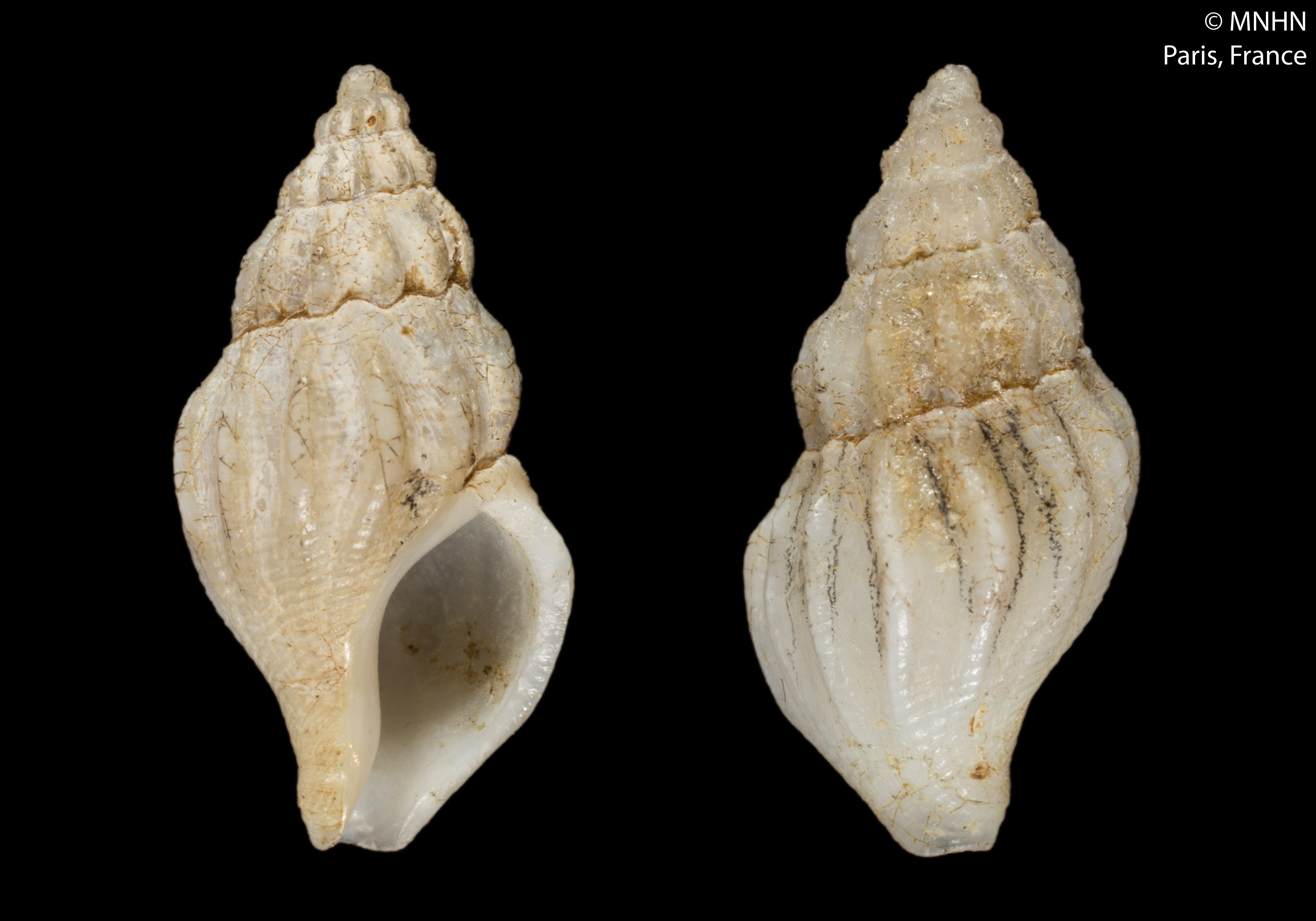
- Shell of Pareuthria atrata

Scientific classification
- Kingdom: Animalia
- Phylum: Mollusca
- Class: Gastropoda
- Subclass: Caenogastropoda
- Order: Neogastropoda
- Superfamily: Buccinoidea
- Family: Cominellidae; Gray, 1857

Type genus
- Cominella Gray, 1850

Genera
- See text

= Cominellidae =

Family of sea snails

The Cominellidae are taxonomic family of large sea snails in the superfamily Buccinoidea.

== Genera ==
- Cominella Gray, 1850
- Falsitromina Dell, 1990
- Lusitromina Harasewych & Kantor, 2004
- Pareuthria Strebel, 1905
- Parficulina Powell, 1958
