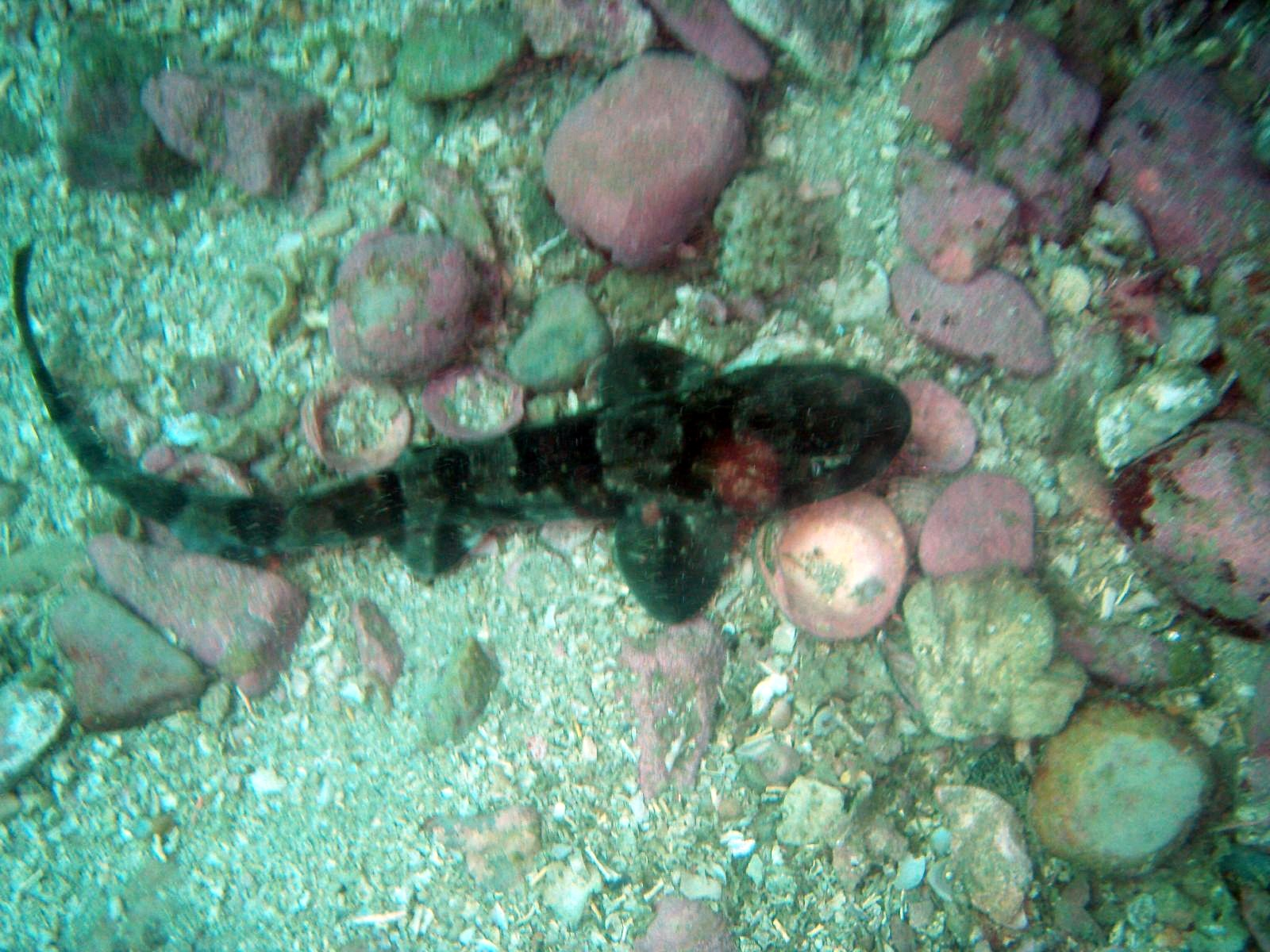

Conservation status
- Least Concern (IUCN 3.1)

Scientific classification
- Kingdom: Animalia
- Phylum: Chordata
- Class: Chondrichthyes
- Subclass: Elasmobranchii
- Division: Selachii
- Order: Carcharhiniformes
- Family: Pentanchidae
- Genus: Haploblepharus
- Species: H. pictus

Binomial name
- Haploblepharus pictus (J. P. Müller & Henle, 1838)
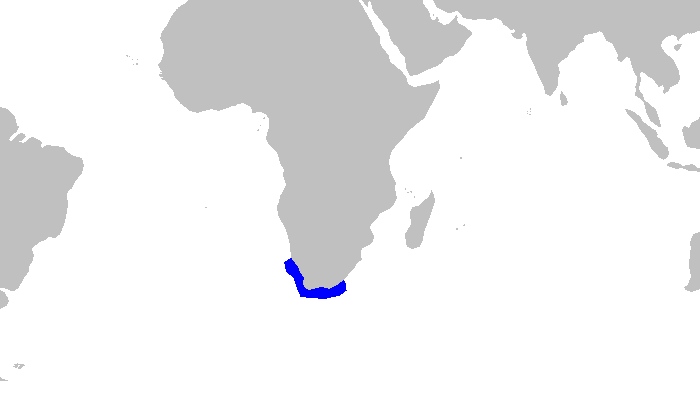
- Range of the dark shyshark

Synonyms
- Scyllium pictum Müller & Henle, 1838

= Dark shyshark =

Species of shark

The dark shyshark or pretty happy (Haploblepharus pictus) is a species of shark belonging to the family Pentanchidae, the deepwater catsharks. This species is endemic to the temperate waters off southern Namibia and western South Africa. It is benthic in nature and inhabits shallow, inshore waters and favors rocky reefs and kelp forests. Growing to 60 cm (24 in) long, this small, stocky shark has a wide, flattened head with a rounded snout and a large flap of skin extending from before the nostrils to the mouth. Its dorsal coloration is extremely variable and may feature black-edged orange to blackish saddles and/or white spots on a light brown to nearly black background.

When threatened, the dark shyshark curls into a ring with its tail covering its eyes, hence the name "shyshark". It preys mainly on small crustaceans, bony fishes, and molluscs. Reproduction is oviparous and proceeds throughout the year. Females lay two egg cases at a time, which hatch after 6–10 months. This harmless species is of little commercial significance due to its small size. It is frequently caught by recreational fishers and persecuted as a pest. The International Union for Conservation of Nature (IUCN) has listed the dark shyshark under Least Concern, as it is common and does not appear to be substantially threatened by fishing or habitat degradation.

== Taxonomy and phylogeny ==
German physicians and biologists Johannes Peter Müller and Friedrich Gustav Jakob Henle originally described the dark shyshark in their 1838–41 Systematische Beschreibung der Plagiostomen, based on five specimens caught off the Cape of Good Hope and deposited in the Rijksmuseum van Natuurlijke Historie in Leiden, The Netherlands. Because of the shark's ornate coloration, they gave it the specific epithet pictum from the Latin for "painted". Originally placed in the now-obsolete genus Scyllium, subsequent authors moved this species to the genus Haploblepharus, coined by American zoologist Samuel Garman in 1913.

The dark shyshark was often regarded to be the same as the puffadder shyshark (H. edwardsii) until 1975, with the publication of A.J. Bass, Jeanette D'Aubrey, and Nat Kistnasamy's review of southern African sharks. It continues to be confused for the other three shyshark species because of its extremely variable coloration. The common name "pretty happy" ("happy" refers to the genus name Haploblepharus) was recently introduced to the public as an easily remembered alternative to the colloquial names "shyshark" and "doughnut", which can apply to several species and have confounded research efforts. Brett Human's 2006 phylogenetic analysis, based on three mitochondrial DNA genes, found that the dark shyshark and the brown shyshark (H. fuscus) are sister species, and that the two make up the more derived clade within the genus.

== Description ==
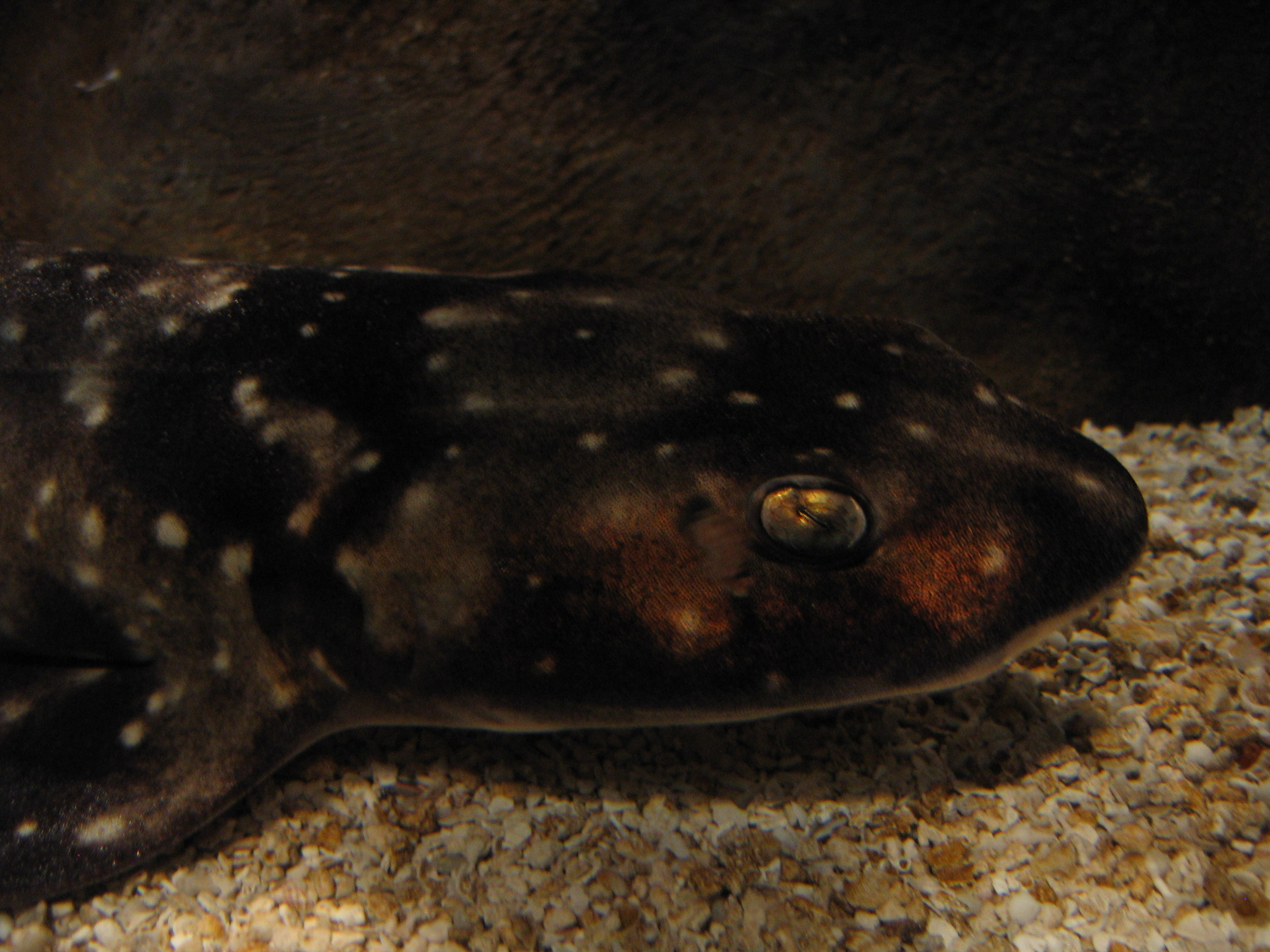
Identifying traits of the dark shyshark include its wide flattened head, broadly rounded snout, and ornate coloration

Reaching no more than 60 cm (24 in) long, the dark shyshark differs from other shysharks in that it is slender-bodied when juvenile and stocky-bodied when adult. Its head is short, wide, and flattened, with a bluntly rounded snout and very large nostrils. The anterior rims of the nostrils bear greatly enlarged lobes of skin, which are fused into a single flap that reaches the mouth; the flap conceals the nasal excurrent openings and a pair of grooves that run between them and the mouth. The large, horizontally oval eyes are equipped with rudimentary nictitating membranes (protective third eyelids), and have strong ridges beneath. The mouth is short but wide and bears furrows at the corners extending onto both jaws. There are 45–83 upper and 47–75 lower tooth rows; each tooth has a long central cusp flanked by a pair of smaller cusplets. The five pairs of gill slits are located fairly high on the body.

The two dorsal fins are of nearly equal size and placed far back on the body, with the first originating over the latter third of the pelvic fin bases and the second over the latter half of the anal fin base. The pectoral and pelvic fins are broad and rounded; the males have stout claspers. The pelvic and anal fins are about as large as the dorsal fins. The broad caudal fin comprises about a fifth of the total body length and has a strong notch near the tip of the upper lobe and an indistinct lower lobe. The skin is thick and covered by well-calcified arrowhead-shaped dermal denticles. The coloration of the dark shyshark is highly variable, and particular individuals can resemble any of the other shyshark species. The background color ranges from light brown to reddish to grayish to almost black above, transitioning abruptly to white or cream below, sometimes with dark blotches beneath the paired fins. There may be 6–8 orange, brown, or blackish variably shaped saddles along the back and tail, edged more or less obviously in black. There may also be white spots within or within and between the saddles.

== Distribution and habitat ==
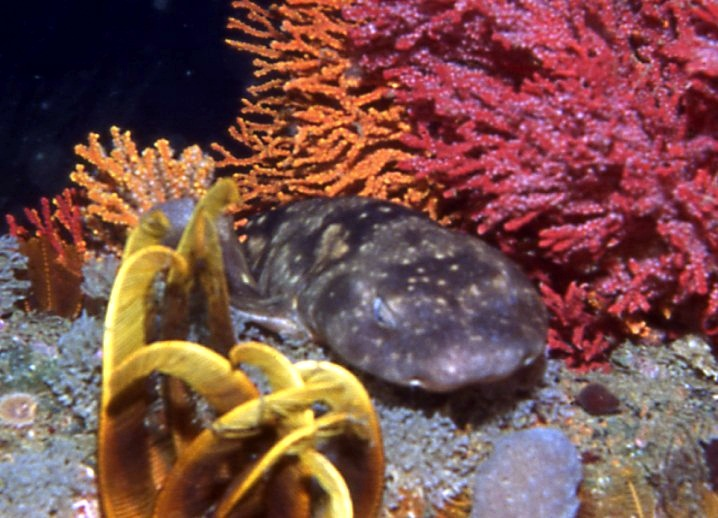
A dark shyshark amongst coral in False Bay, South Africa

The range of the dark shyshark is restricted to the coastal waters of southern Africa, from north of Lüderitz in southern Namibia to east of the Storms River mouth in the Eastern Cape Province of South Africa. It is abundant, particularly west of Cape Agulhas. This species is a bottom-dweller found close inshore, from the intertidal zone to a depth of 35 m (115 ft). It prefers rocky reefs and kelp forests, but also presumably traverses sandy flats in between patches of more suitable habitat. As this shark is not known to travel long distances, there is likely subpopulation differentiation across parts of its range.

== Biology and ecology ==
The dark shyshark is a generalist predator whose main food sources are, in descending order of importance, small benthic crustaceans, bony fishes, and molluscs. Larger sharks consume proportionately more crustaceans. Polychaete worms and echinoderms are also taken on occasion, and algae may be swallowed incidentally. This species is preyed upon by the broadnose sevengill shark (Notorynchus cepedianus), and potentially also other large fishes and marine mammals. When threatened, it adopts a characteristic defense posture in which it curls into a ring with its tail over its eyes; this behavior likely makes the shark harder to swallow and is the origin of the common names "shyshark" and "doughnut". In captivity, the whelks Burnupena papyracea and B. lagenaria have been documented piercing the egg cases of this species and extracting the yolk. A known parasite of the dark shyshark is the trypanosome Trypanosoma haploblephari, which infests the blood.

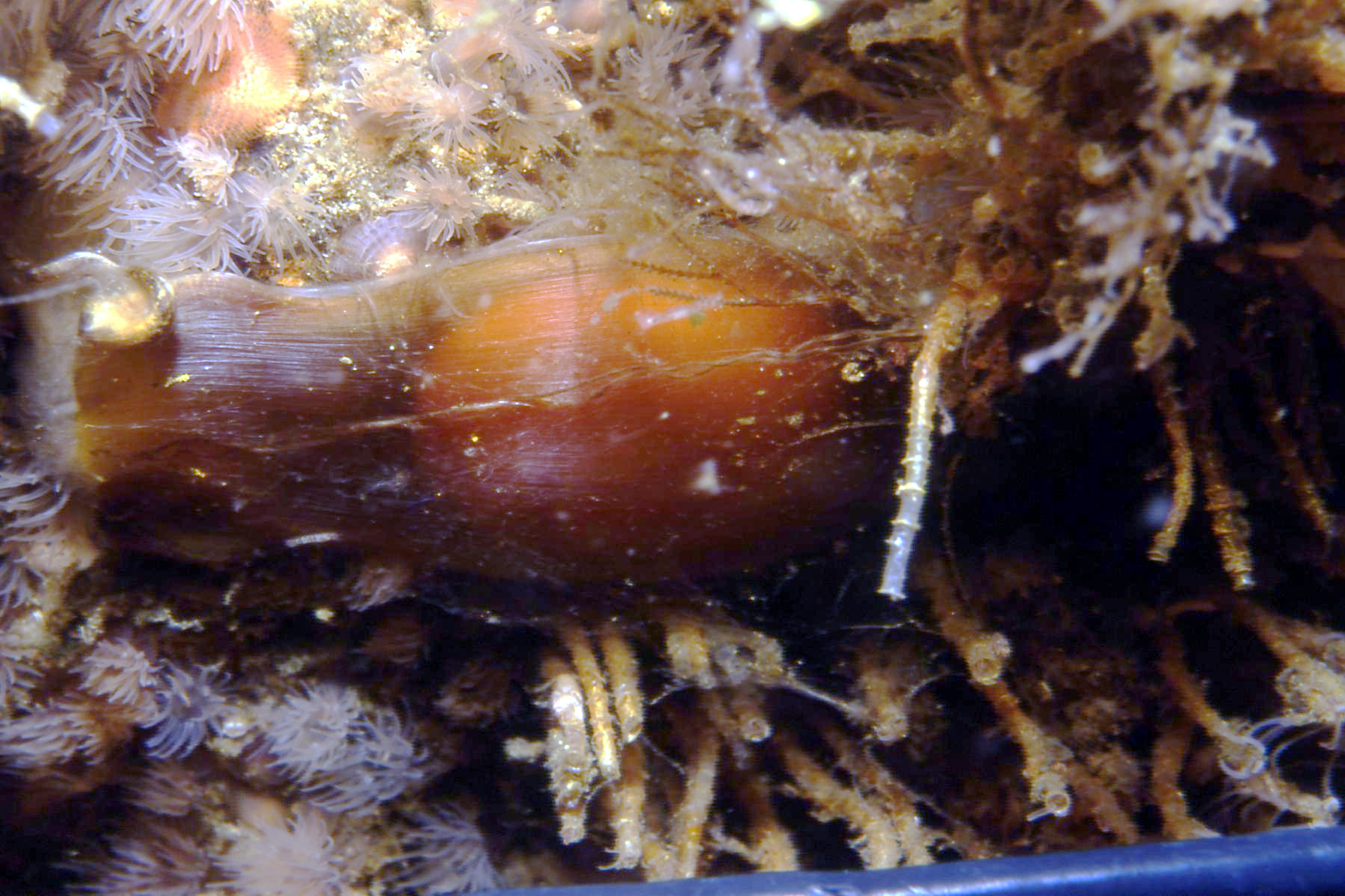
The egg case of the dark shyshark is purse-shaped and uniformly brown

Like other members of its genus, the dark shyshark is oviparous; adult females have a single functional ovary and two functional oviducts. There appears to be no distinct breeding season and reproduction occurs year-round. Females produce mature eggs two at a time, one per oviduct. The eggs are enclosed in purse-shaped capsules measuring 5.5 cm (2.2 in) long and 2.5 cm (0.98 in) across; each capsule is plain amber to dark brown in color and bears thin, coiled tendrils at the four corners. In one observation of an egg that hatched after 104 days, the developing embryo had external gill filaments until it was 50 days old, and completely absorbed its yolk sac shortly before hatching. Eggs in nature typically hatch in 6–10 months, with the newly hatched shark measuring 10–12 cm (3.9–4.7 in) long. Both sexes grow at approximately the same rate, reaching sexual maturity at around 15 years of age. Mature males and females range from 40–57 cm (16–22 in) and 36–60 cm (14–24 in) long respectively. The maximum lifespan is 25 years.

== Human interactions ==
The dark shyshark poses no danger to humans and is too small to be of commercial importance. Many are hooked by sport fishers casting from the shore, who regard the shark as a pest and often kill it. It may also be caught by subsistence fishers and in lobster traps and bottom trawls, though not in substantial quantities. This shark occasionally finds its way into the aquarium trade, though there is no direct fishing for this purpose. As the dark shyshark remains common and does not seem heavily threatened by human activity, it has been assessed as Least Concern by the International Union for Conservation of Nature (IUCN). Its small range does raise concerns that an increase in regional fishing pressure or habitat degradation could impact the entire population.
