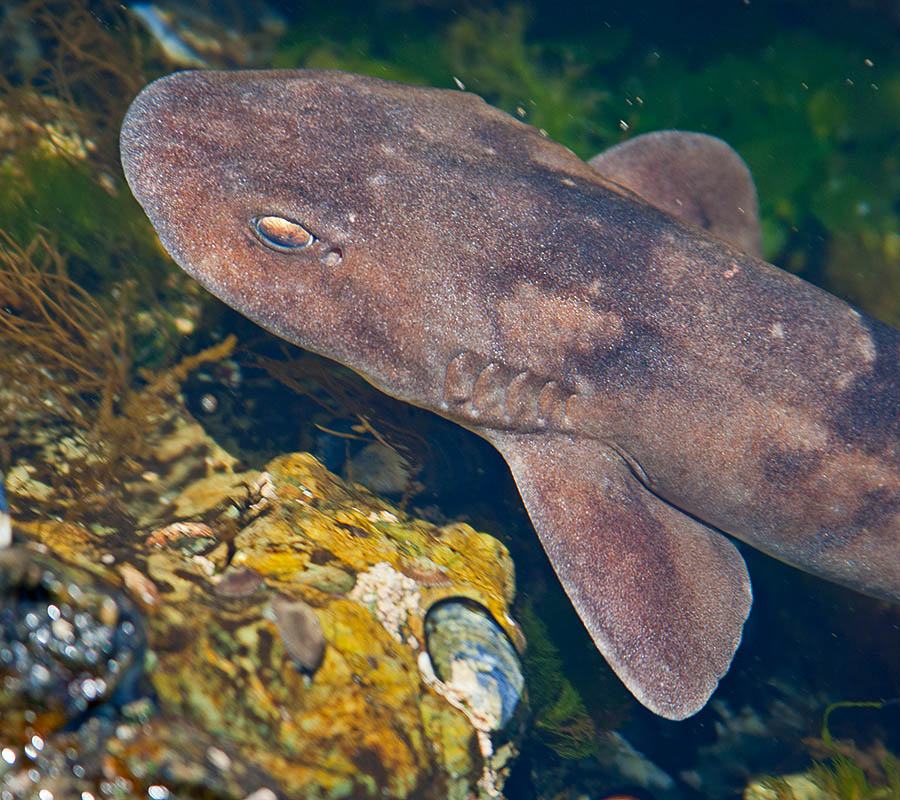

Conservation status
- Vulnerable (IUCN 3.1)

Scientific classification
- Kingdom: Animalia
- Phylum: Chordata
- Class: Chondrichthyes
- Subclass: Elasmobranchii
- Division: Selachii
- Order: Carcharhiniformes
- Family: Pentanchidae
- Genus: Haploblepharus
- Species: H. fuscus

Binomial name
- Haploblepharus fuscus J. L. B. Smith, 1950
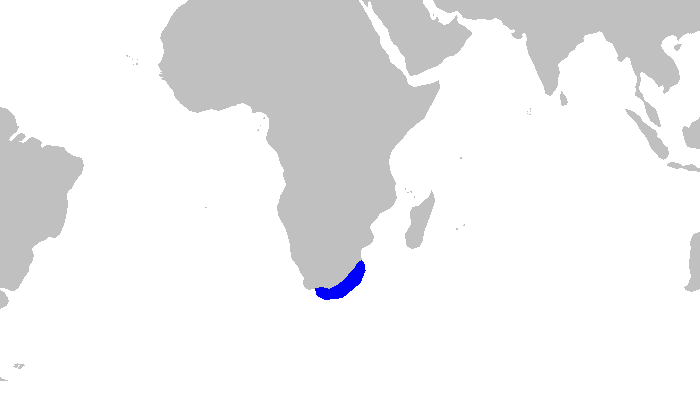
- Range of the brown shyshark

= Brown shyshark =

Species of shark

The brown shyshark or plain happy (Haploblepharus fuscus) is a species of shark belonging to the family Pentanchidae, the deepwater catsharks. It is endemic to the shallow, coastal waters of South Africa from west of Cape Agulhas to KwaZulu-Natal. This benthic species is usually found over sandy or rocky bottoms. Measuring up to 73 cm (29 in) long, the brown shyshark is stoutly built, with a broad, flattened head and rounded snout. Unlike other shysharks, the brown shyshark has a plain brown color, though some individuals have faint "saddle" markings or light or dark spots. When threatened, this shark curls into a circle with its tail over its eyes, which is the origin of the name "shyshark". It feeds on bony fishes and lobsters, and is oviparous with females laying pairs of egg capsules. The International Union for Conservation of Nature (IUCN) has assessed this harmless species as Vulnerable. It is of no commercial or recreational interest, but its limited distribution makes its entire population vulnerable to increases in fishing pressure or habitat degradation.

== Taxonomy and phylogeny ==
The brown shyshark was described by South African ichthyologist James Leonard Brierley Smith in a 1950 article for The Annals and Magazine of Natural History. He chose the specific epithet fuscus, which is Latin for "brown". The type specimen is a 57 cm (22 in) long adult male caught off East London, South Africa. A 2006 phylogenetic analysis based on three mitochondrial DNA genes found that the brown shyshark and the dark shyshark (H. pictus) are sister species. They are the more derived members of the genus relative to the basal puffadder shyshark (H. edwardsii).

== Description ==
A small species reaching a maximum known length of 73 cm (29 in), the dark shyshark has a stocky body and a short, broad head. The snout is blunt and dorsally flattened. The eyes are large and oval-shaped, with a rudimentary nictitating membrane (protective third eyelid) and a strong ridge underneath. The nostrils are very large, and are flanked by greatly expanded, triangular flaps of skin that reach the mouth. These nasal flaps cover a pair of deep grooves that connect the nasal excurrent (outflow) openings and the mouth. There are furrows at the corners of the mouth on both jaws. The teeth have a central cusp and a pair of smaller cusplets on the sides. The five pairs of gill slits are positioned on the upper sides of the body.

The first dorsal fin originates well behind the pelvic fin origins, and the second originates behind the anal fin origin. The pectoral fins are moderately large, and the dorsal, pelvic, and anal fins are of similar sizes. The caudal fin is short and broad, with a notch near the tip of the upper lobe and an indistinct lower lobe. The skin is thick and covered by well-calcified leaf-like dermal denticles. The coloration is a plain brown above and white below, though some individuals have a series of faint darker saddle-like markings or black or white spots.

== Distribution and habitat ==
The brown shyshark has a restricted distribution along the coast of South Africa, from the Western and Eastern Cape Provinces to southern KwaZulu-Natal Province. It is usually found close to the bottom over sandy flats or rocky reefs, from the intertidal zone to a depth of 35 m (115 ft). However, it has been reported from as deep as 133 m (436 ft). The range of this species overlaps with the puffadder shyshark in the southeastern Cape region. There, the brown shyshark tends to favor shallow inshore habitats, while the puffadder shyshark inhabits deeper offshore waters.

== Biology and ecology ==
The brown shyshark is a sedentary, bottom-dwelling species; one tag-recapture study found that recaptured sharks had moved no more than 8 km (5.0 mi) from their original tagging location. This shark is known to feed on bony fishes and lobsters. Like its relatives in the genus, it exhibits a curious response of curling into a ring with its tail covering its eyes when threatened, hence the name "shyshark". Reproduction is oviparous, with females depositing egg capsules (known as "mermaid's purses") two at a time. In captivity, the whelks Burnupena papyracea and B. lagenaria have been documented piercing the egg cases and extracting the yolk. Males reach sexual maturity at a length of 68–69 cm (27–27 in), and females at a length of 60–61 cm (24–24 in).

== Human interactions ==
The brown shyshark is harmless to humans and not targeted by any commercial fisheries due to its small size, though it may be caught as bycatch. It is regarded as a minor pest species by recreational anglers and usually discarded or killed when hooked. The International Union for Conservation of Nature (IUCN) has assessed this species as Vulnerable. Although it is locally abundant, heavy fishing occurs throughout its small range and an increase in fishery activities or pollution could potentially affect the entire population. The brown shyshark adapts readily to captivity.
