= Quagga (disambiguation) =

Quagga is an extinct subspecies of the plains zebra.

Quagga may also refer to:

- Quagga (software), the unofficial successor to GNU Zebra, a routing software suite
- Quagga catshark, a small shark type
- Quagga mussel, a mollusk species native to Ukraine

== See also ==
- Quokka, an Australian marsupial
