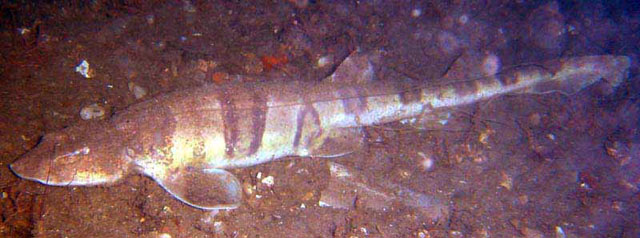

Conservation status
- Vulnerable (IUCN 3.1)

Scientific classification
- Kingdom: Animalia
- Phylum: Chordata
- Class: Chondrichthyes
- Subclass: Elasmobranchii
- Division: Selachii
- Order: Carcharhiniformes
- Family: Pentanchidae
- Genus: Halaelurus
- Species: H. natalensis

Binomial name
- Halaelurus natalensis (Regan, 1904)
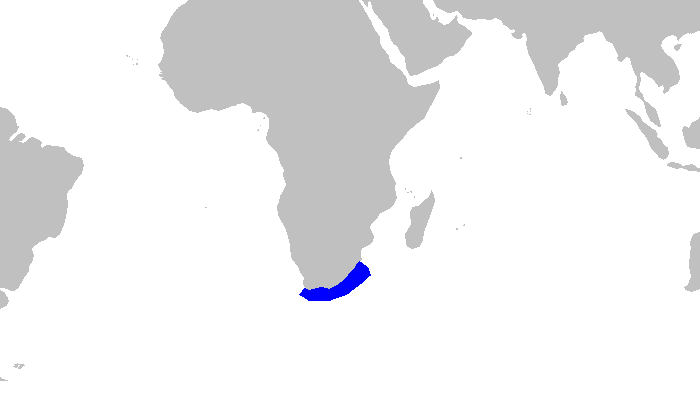
- Range of the tiger catshark

Synonyms
- Scyllium natalense Regan, 1904

= Tiger catshark =

Species of shark

The tiger catshark (Halaelurus natalensis) is a species of shark belonging to the family Pentanchidae, the deepwater catsharks. It is found over sandy areas and near reef peripheries off South Africa and perhaps Mozambique, from close to shore to usually no deeper than 100 m (330 ft). Reaching a length of 50 cm (20 in), this small, slim shark has a broad, flattened head with an upturned snout tip. It can additionally be identified by its dorsal colour pattern of ten dark brown saddles on a yellowish brown background.

Bottom-dwelling and inactive, the tiger catshark feeds on a wide variety of fishes and invertebrates from on or near the sea floor. An oviparous species, the female retains her eggs internally until the embryos are at an advanced state of development, resulting in a relatively short hatching time after laying. Between 12 and 22 encapsulated eggs are produced at a time, which the female attaches to the bottom. The tiger catshark is caught incidentally by commercial and recreational fishers but has no economic value. It has been listed as vulnerable by the International Union for Conservation of Nature (IUCN).

== Taxonomy ==
British ichthyologist Charles Tate Regan described the tiger catshark in a 1904 issue of the scientific journal Annals and Magazine of Natural History, based on two specimens presented to the British Museum by J. F. Queckett. He placed the species in the genus Scyllium (a synonym of Scyliorhinus) and gave it the specific epithet natalense, because the type specimens were reportedly collected off the Natal coast of South Africa (though there is suspicion that they were mislabelled and actually came from Algoa Bay). Later authors reassigned this species to the genus Halaelurus. The lined catshark (Halaelurus lineatus) was once treated as conspecific to the tiger catshark, until it was described as a separate species in 1975.

== Description ==
The body of the tiger catshark is slim and firm, and it grows up to 50 cm (20 in) long. The head is broad and flattened, with a distinct and upturned snout tip. The horizontally oval eyes are situated high on the head and protected by rudimentary nictitating membranes. Beneath each eye is a broad ridge, and behind is a spiracle. The medium-sized nostrils are divided by lobe-like flaps of skin on their anterior rims. The nasal flaps do not reach the large mouth, which forms a wide arch and bears short furrows around the corners. When the mouth is closed, the centre of the lower jaw falls well short of the upper, leaving the upper teeth exposed. The teeth are small and 3-cusped (rarely 5-cusped), with the central cusp the longest. The five pairs of gill slits are placed higher than the level of the mouth and face somewhat upwards.

The pectoral fins are fairly large and rounded. The origin of the first dorsal fin lies over the last third of the pelvic fin bases, while the origin of the much larger second dorsal fin lies over the rear of the anal fin. The claspers of adult males are moderately long and tapering, though those of some individuals may be knob-shaped and spiky. The anal fin is roughly equal in size to the pelvic fins, and smaller but longer-based than the second dorsal fin. The short caudal fin has an indistinct lower lobe and a ventral notch near the tip of the upper lobe. The skin is thick; the dermal denticles have three-pointed crowns and are widely spaced compared to other species in the genus. Coloured yellowish brown above and cream below, this shark has a characteristic series of ten dorsal saddles from the head to the tail; each saddle is dark brown with a darker edge and a lighter middle. Unlike in the similar lined catshark, there are no spots or additional markings between the saddles.

== Distribution and habitat ==
The tiger catshark is endemic to southern Africa, but the limits of its distribution are not well known. It is known to occur off the Western and Eastern Cape, South Africa, while easterly records from KwaZulu-Natal and Mozambique are uncertain due to confusion with the lined catshark. A common, bottom-dwelling inhabitant of the continental shelf, this shark favours sandy flats and the edges of reefs. It is usually found from the shore to a depth of 100 m (330 ft); sharks in the eastern part of its range tend to occur in deeper water than those in the west. There are species records from as deep as 172 m (564 ft), as well as a single dubious record from 355 m (1,165 ft) down on the continental slope. It may segregate by size, with the adults found farther from shore.

== Biology and ecology ==
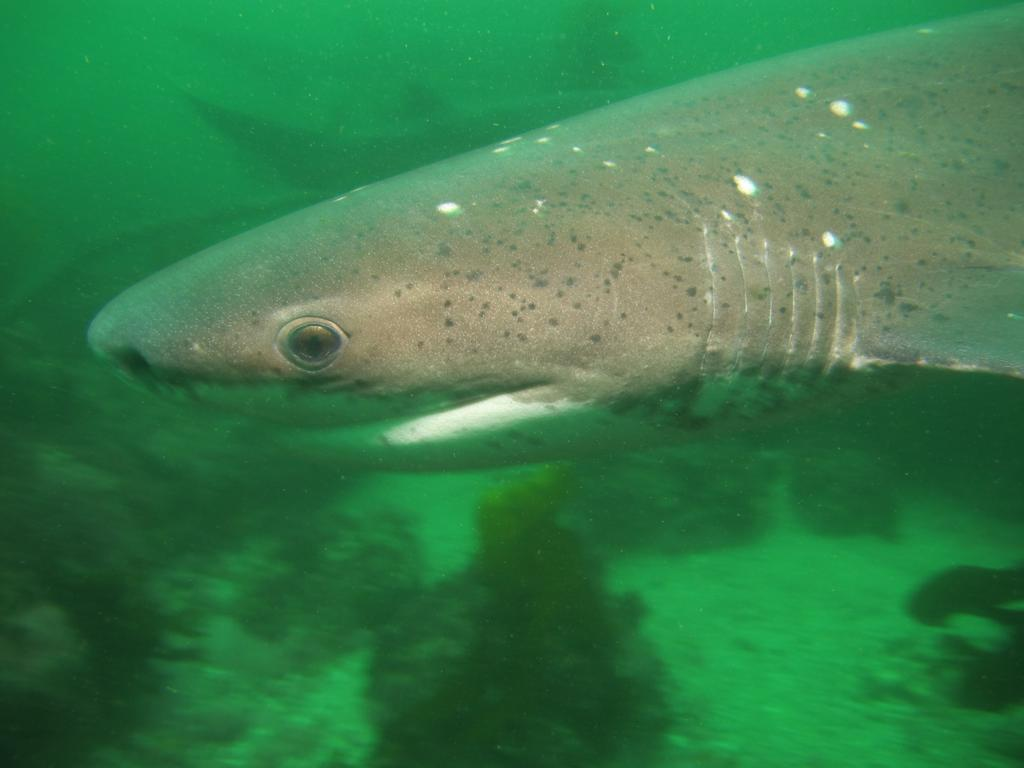
The broadnose sevengill shark is known to prey on the tiger catshark.

The tiger catshark is a sluggish predator of a diverse array of benthic organisms. Its diet is dominated by bony fishes and crustaceans, and also includes cephalopods, polychaete worms, smaller sharks, and scavenged fish offal. It has been observed at the spawning grounds of the chokka squid (Loligo vulgaris reynaudi), feeding on squid that have descended to the bottom to mate and deposit eggs. Documented predators of this species include the broadnose sevengill shark (Notorynchus cepedianus) and the ragged tooth shark (Carcharias taurus).

Reproduction in the tiger catshark is oviparous: females produce 6–11 (typically 6–9) eggs in each of their two oviducts at a time. The eggs are contained in tough capsules around 4 cm (1.6 in) long and 1.5 cm (0.59 in) across; the capsule has thick tendrils at the corners that allow it to be secured to the sea floor. The female retains the eggs internally until the embryos are substantially developed, measuring at least 4.3 cm (1.7 in) long. Thus, the eggs hatch within only one or two months of being laid, reducing the amount of time that they are exposed to predators. Males and females begin to reach sexual maturity at lengths of 29–35 cm (11–14 in) and 30–44 cm (12–17 in) respectively.

== Human interactions ==
Harmless to humans, the tiger catshark is caught incidentally by bottom trawlers, recreational anglers, and rarely squid fishers. Though edible, it is not a valued catch and is usually discarded. The International Union for Conservation of Nature (IUCN) presently classifies this species as vulnerable.
