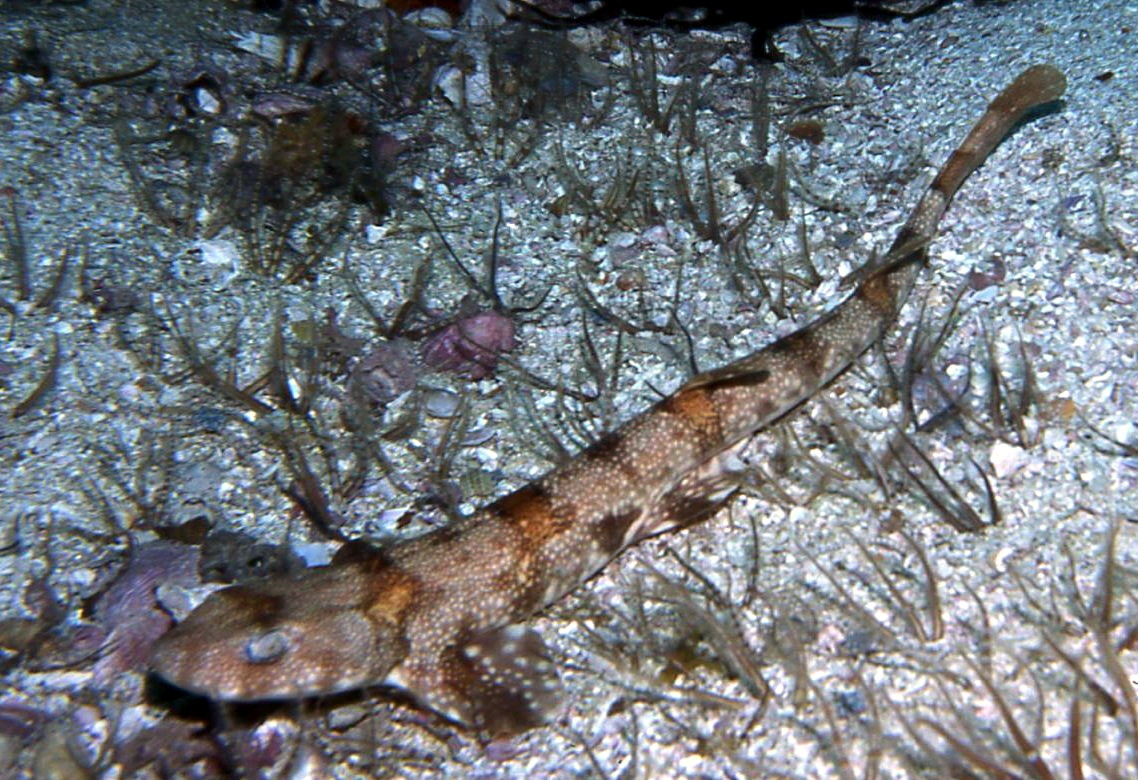
- Puffadder shyshark (H. edwardsii)

Scientific classification
- Kingdom: Animalia
- Phylum: Chordata
- Class: Chondrichthyes
- Subclass: Elasmobranchii
- Division: Selachii
- Order: Carcharhiniformes
- Family: Pentanchidae
- Genus: Haploblepharus; Garman, 1913

Type species
- Squalus edwardsii Schinz 1822

= Haploblepharus =

Genus of sharks

Haploblepharus is a genus of deepwater catsharks, belonging to the family Pentanchidae, containing four species of shysharks. Their common name comes from a distinctive defensive behavior in which the shark curls into a circle and covers its eyes with its tail. The genus is endemic to southern Africa, inhabiting shallow coastal waters. All four species are small, stout-bodied sharks with broad, flattened heads and rounded snouts. They are characterized by very large nostrils with enlarged, triangular flaps of skin that reach the mouth, and deep grooves between the nostrils and the mouth. Shysharks are bottom-dwelling predators of bony fishes and invertebrates. They are oviparous, with the females laying egg capsules. These harmless sharks are of no commercial or recreational interest, though their highly limited distributions in heavily fished South African waters are of potential conservation concern.

== Taxonomy and phylogeny ==
The genus Haploblepharus was created by American zoologist Samuel Garman in 1913, in the 36th volume of Memoirs of the Museum of Comparative Zoology, at Harvard College, to contain the puffadder shyshark, then known as Squalus edwardsii. The name is derived from the Greek haplóos meaning "single", and blepharos meaning "eyelid".

In 1988, Leonard Compagno placed Haploblepharus with Halaelurus and Holohalaelurus in the tribe Halaelurini of the family Scyliorhinidae, based on morphological characters. This interpretation was corroborated by a 2006 phylogenetic analysis based on three mitochondrial DNA genes. However, that study also found that within this group Haploblepharus is most closely related to the genus Halaelurus, which is inconsistent with the presence of three autapomorphic traits in Haploblepharus that are not shared by either Halaelurus or Holohalaelurus. Within the genus, the puffadder shyshark is sister to all other species.

== Species ==
- Haploblepharus edwardsii (Schinz, 1822) (puffadder shyshark)
- Haploblepharus fuscus J. L. B. Smith, 1950 (brown shyshark)
- Haploblepharus kistnasamyi Human & Compagno, 2006 (Natal shyshark)
- Haploblepharus pictus (J. P. Müller & Henle, 1838) (dark shyshark)

== Distribution and habitat ==
All four shyshark species are endemic to the southern tip of Africa; three of them are found only off South Africa, while the range of the dark shyshark extends to southern Namibia. They are bottom-dwelling in nature and usually found in shallow, coastal waters over sandy or rocky bottoms.

== Description ==
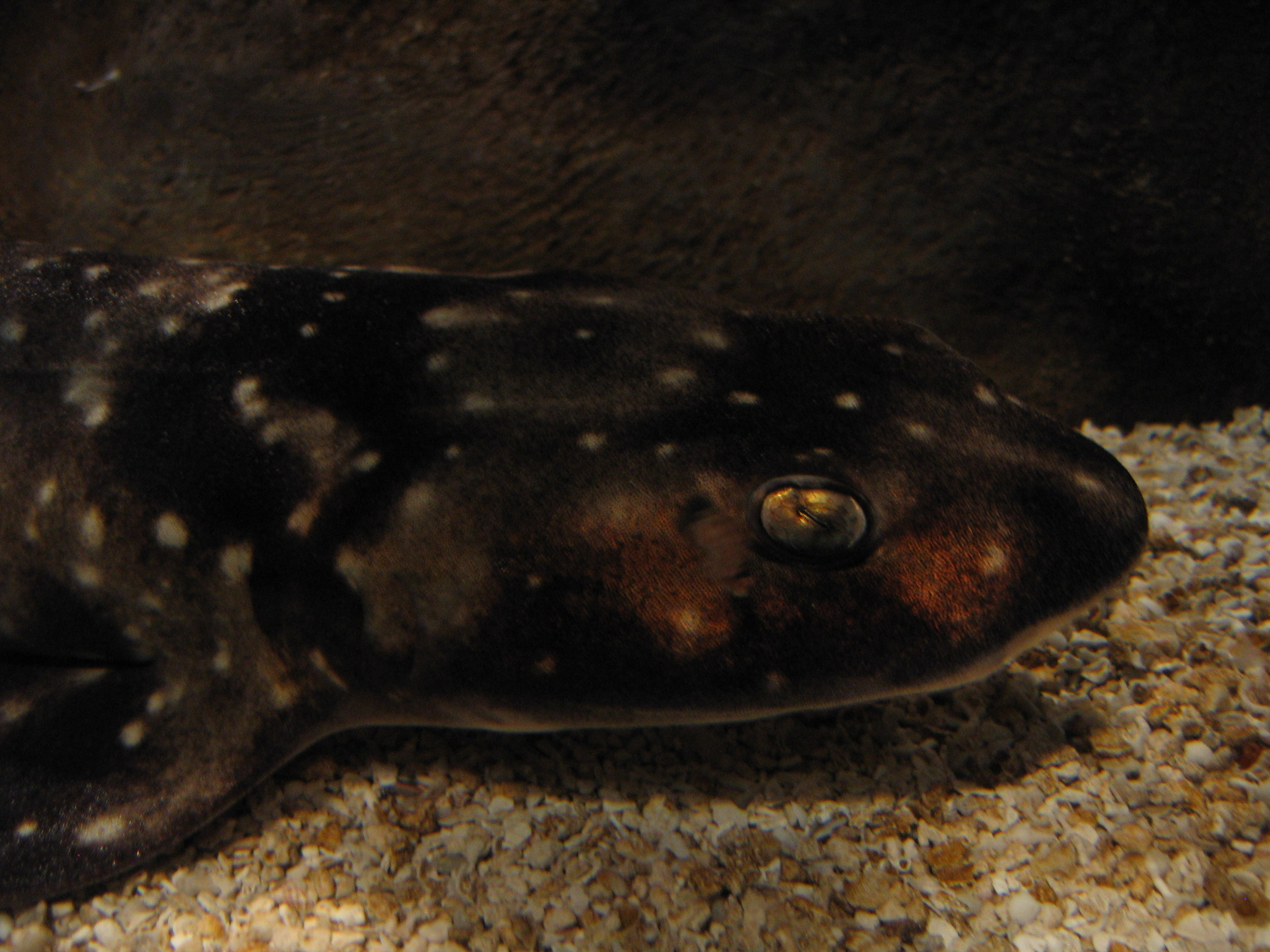
The broad, flattened head of a dark shyshark

Different shyshark species are very similar to one another in appearance but can be reliably differentiated using morphological measurements. However, in the field the only way to readily tell them apart is by their different color patterns, and even this may be problematic as individuals of the same species can vary considerably in coloration. All four species are small, seldom exceeding 60 cm (24 in) in length.

A shyshark has a stout, spindle-shaped body and a short head comprising less than one-fifth of the total length. The head is broad and dorsally flattened, with a rounded snout. The large, oval eyes have cat-like slit pupils, a rudimentary nictitating membrane (protective third eyelid), and a prominent ridge running underneath. A distinguishing trait of this genus are the large nostrils partially covered by greatly expanded, triangular flaps of skin that overlap the mouth and cover a pair of deep grooves between the nasal excurrent (outflow) openings and the mouth. The mouth is short and curved, with furrows at the corners extending onto both jaws. The teeth have a central cusp and smaller lateral cusplets. The five pairs of gill slits are located on the upper side of the body.

The two dorsal fins are set far back on the body, the first originating behind the pelvic fin midbases and the second originating behind the anal fin midbase. The pectoral fins are moderately large; the dorsal, pelvic, and anal fins are of similar size. The broad caudal fin comprises a fifth of the total length; the upper lobe has a deep ventral notch near the tip and the lower lobe is virtually absent. The skin is thick and covered by well-calcified, leaf-shaped dermal denticles. The coloration is brown above and white below; the brown shyshark is usually plain while the other species have varying patterns of darker "saddles" and white spots.

== Biology and ecology ==
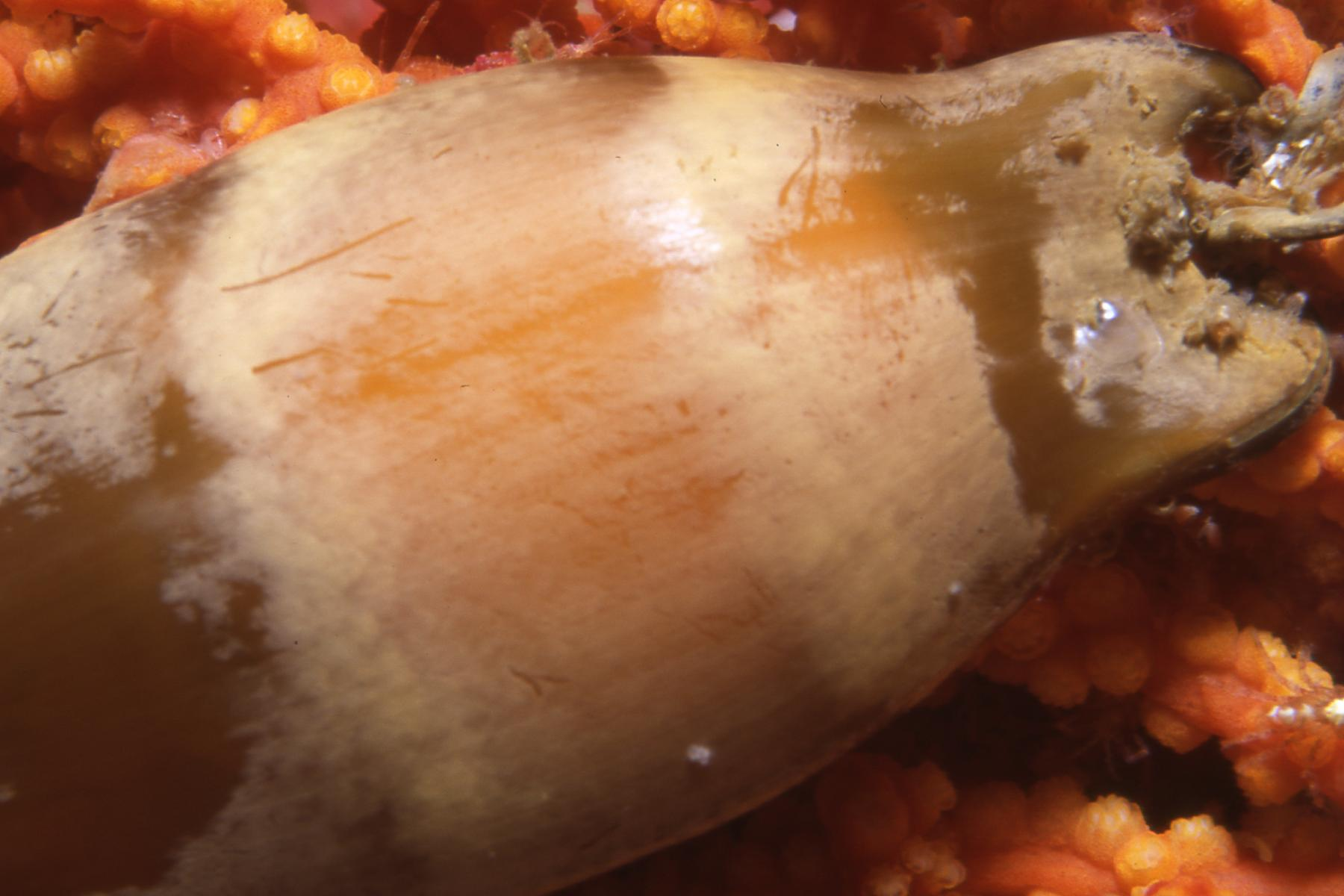
The egg case of a puffadder shyshark

Shysharks feed on a variety of small benthic bony fishes and invertebrates. In turn, they are preyed upon by larger fishes and marine mammals. When threatened, these sharks adopt a curious posture in which they curl their bodies into a ring and cover their eyes with their tails, which is the origin of the name "shyshark". This behavior likely serves to make the shark more difficult for a predator to swallow. Shysharks are oviparous with females producing egg capsules (known as "mermaid's purses") two at a time. Reproduction has been investigated in the puffadder and dark shysharks; neither species appears to have a distinct breeding season, and their eggs take around three and a half weeks to hatch.

== Human interactions ==
Due to their small size, shysharks pose no danger to humans and are not sought by either commercial or recreational fishers. They are taken as bycatch and hooked by shore anglers, who regard them (and other catsharks) as minor pests. Although shysharks are not uncommon, their extremely limited distribution within heavily fished waters raises concerns that a local increase in fishing pressure or habitat degradation could affect entire species populations. As a result, the International Union for Conservation of Nature (IUCN) has assessed two shyshark species as Near Threatened.
