= Burnupena denseliriata =

Scientific classification
- Kingdom: Animalia
- Phylum: Mollusca
- Class: Gastropoda
- Subclass: Caenogastropoda
- Order: Neogastropoda
- Family: incertae sedis
- Genus: Burnupena
- Species: B. denseliriata

Binomial name
- Burnupena denseliriata Dempster & Branch, 1999

Species of gastropod

Burnupena denseliriata is a species of sea snail, a marine gastropod mollusc.
