= Burnupena rotunda =

Scientific classification
- Kingdom: Animalia
- Phylum: Mollusca
- Class: Gastropoda
- Subclass: Caenogastropoda
- Order: Neogastropoda
- Family: incertae sedis
- Genus: Burnupena
- Species: B. rotunda

Binomial name
- Burnupena rotunda Dempster & Branch, 1999

Species of gastropod

Burnupena rotunda is a species of sea snail, a marine gastropod mollusc.
