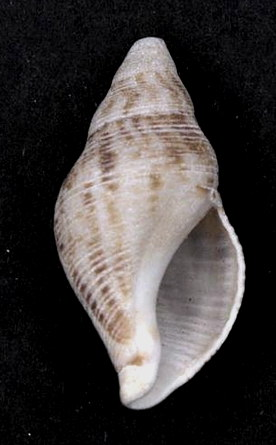
- Apertural view of a shell of Burnupena catarrhacta (museum specimen at Naturalis Biodiversity Center)

Scientific classification
- Domain: Eukaryota
- Kingdom: Animalia
- Phylum: Mollusca
- Class: Gastropoda
- Subclass: Caenogastropoda
- Order: Neogastropoda
- Family: incertae sedis
- Genus: Burnupena
- Species: B. catarrhacta

Binomial name
- Burnupena catarrhacta (Gmelin, 1791)

Synonyms
- Buccinum catarrhacta Gmelin, 1791 (original combination); Buccinum delalandii Kiener, 1834; Buccinum dunkeri Küster, 1858; Burnupena delalandii (Kiener, 1834); Burnupena dunkeri (Küster, 1858); Fusus lineolatus Dunker in Philippi, 1844 (Invalid: junior homonym of Fusus lineolatus Costa; 1840; Buccinum dunkeri Küster, 1858, is a replacement name)

= Burnupena catarrhacta =

Species of gastropod

Burnupena catarrhacta, common name the flame-patterned burnupena, is a species of sea snail, a marine gastropod mollusc.

== Description ==
The length of the shell varies between 25 mm and 50 mm.

The ovate shell is elongated and subturrited. The external surface is of a bluish ash color, marked with very fine, close striae. It is also ornamented with longitudinal undulated bands or flames, formed by lines more or less approximated. The epidermis is greenish. The slightly pointed spire is composed of six whorls, which are slightly convex, and united by a pretty delicate regular suture. The aperture is oblong ovate and effuse towards the base. The outer lip is smooth and white, marked interiorly, at a short distance from the edge, with sixteen or eighteen transverse striae of a reddish brown. The columella is slightly arched and whitish.

== Distribution ==
This marine species occurs off the West Coast of South Africa.
