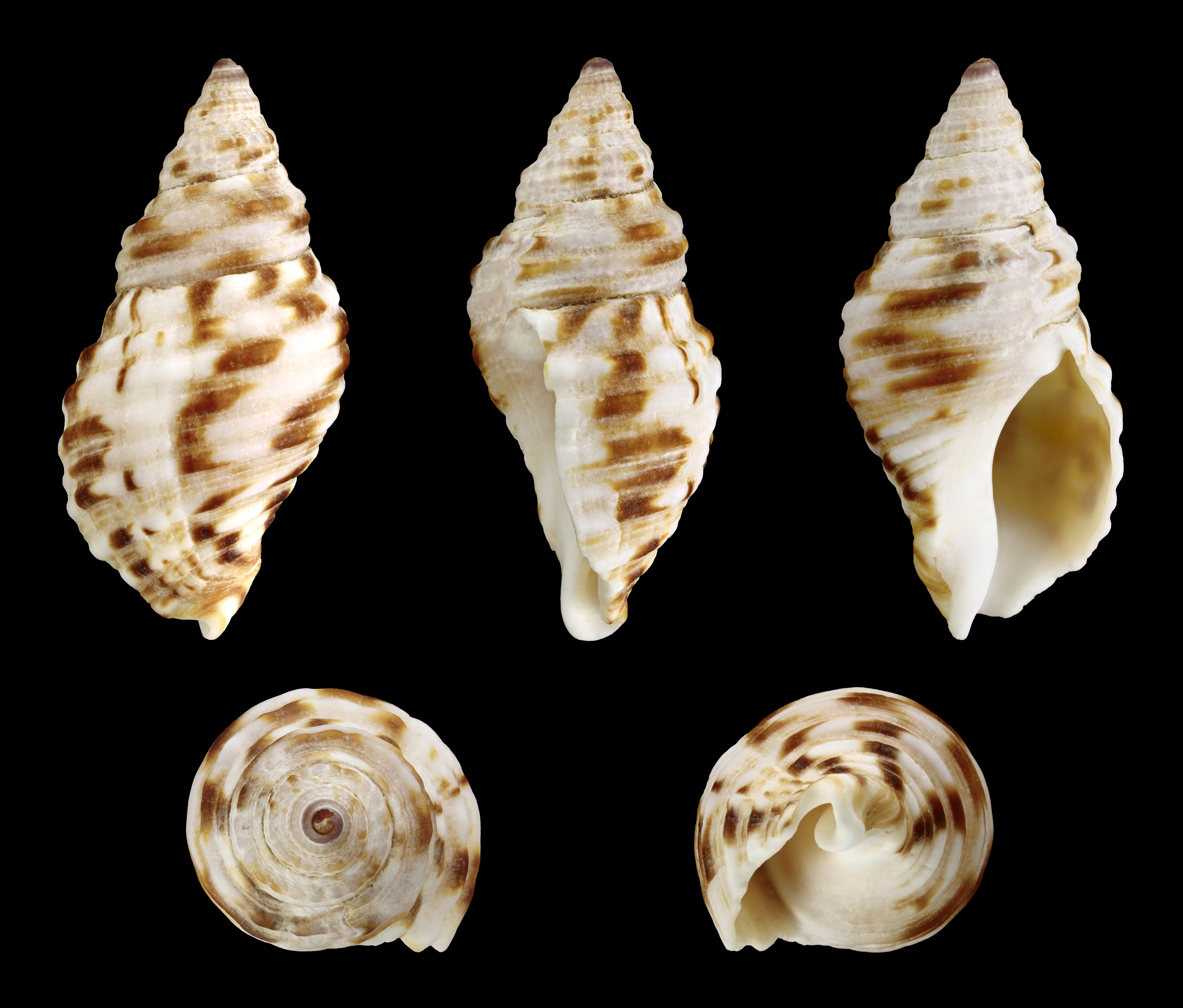

Scientific classification
- Domain: Eukaryota
- Kingdom: Animalia
- Phylum: Mollusca
- Class: Gastropoda
- Subclass: Caenogastropoda
- Order: Neogastropoda
- Family: incertae sedis
- Genus: Burnupena
- Species: B. pubescens

Binomial name
- Burnupena pubescens (Küster, 1858)

Synonyms
- Buccinum pubescens Küster, 1858; Buccinum tigrinum Kiener, 1834 (non Gmelin, 1791); Burnupena tigrina (Kiener, 1834); Cominella translucida Turton, 1932

= Burnupena pubescens =

Species of gastropod

Burnupena pubescens is a species of sea snail, a marine gastropod mollusc.

== Description ==
The size of an adult shell varies between 40 mm and 50 mm. Very similar to B. papyracea. Also often covered with the encrusting bryozoan Alcyonidium nodosum and differs mainly in being smaller and having fine longitudinal ridges which cross the spirals to produce a slightly checkered effect, generally not visible under the bryozoan.

The ovate shell is elongated and subturreted. It is generally of a clear fawn color, marked with numerous spots of a deep chestnut or reddish color, oblong or quadrangular, alternating with other similar spots of a dull white. The first, oftentimes, form longitudinal bands. The pointed spire is conical and, formed of six slightly convex whorls, the lowest of which is as large as all the others. They are flattened and angular at the upper part, crowned upon the angle by a subgranulated margin. The suture is accompanied at the upper part of each whorl, by a small, slightly convex and undulating margin. Upon the body whorl are seen nine rounded, transverse, very angular folds. The other whorls are also ornamented with three folds. The spaces between them bear fine transverse striae. The aperture is white, ovate and elongated. The thick columella is rounded, white and almost straight. The right edge is thin, and slightly sharp.

== Distribution ==
This marine species is found in South African waters off Namibia and KwaZuluNatal.
