= Quagga catshark =

- Specimen from Quilon, India

Conservation status
- Data Deficient (IUCN 3.1)

Scientific classification
- Kingdom: Animalia
- Phylum: Chordata
- Class: Chondrichthyes
- Subclass: Elasmobranchii
- Division: Selachii
- Order: Carcharhiniformes
- Family: Pentanchidae
- Genus: Halaelurus
- Species: H. quagga

Binomial name
- Halaelurus quagga (Alcock, 1899)
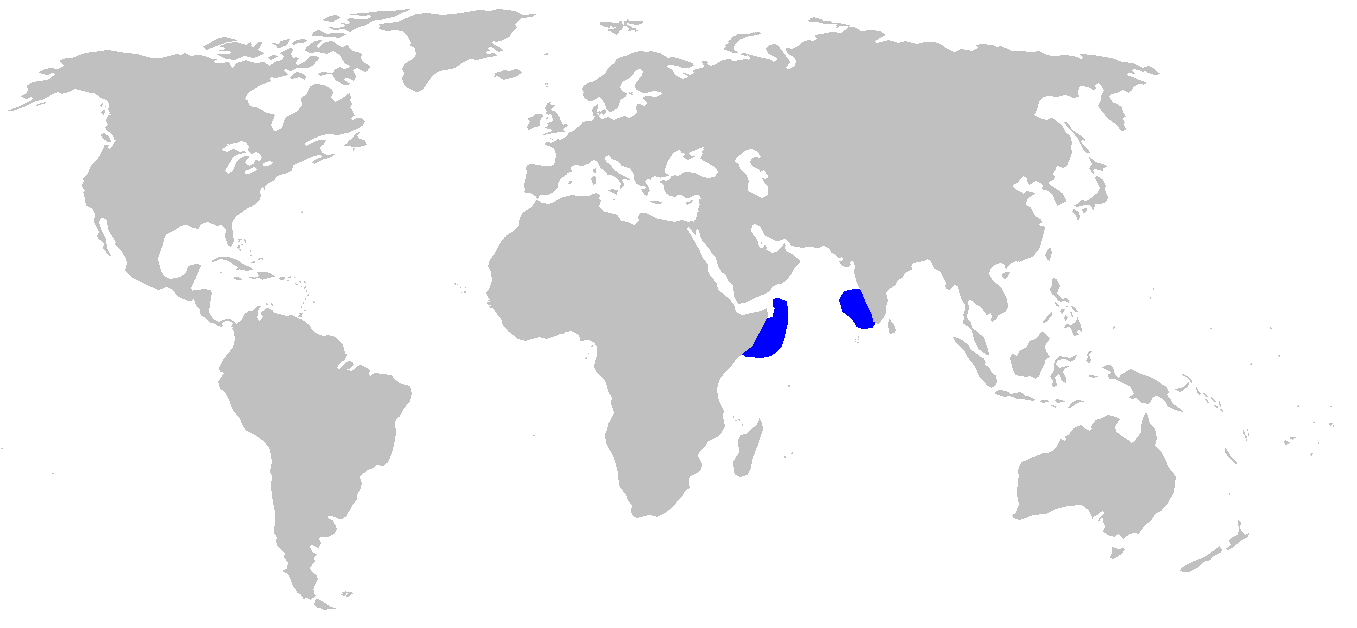
- Range of the quagga catshark

Synonyms
- Scyllium quagga Alcock, 1899

Species of fish

The quagga catshark (Halaelurus quagga) is a species of shark belonging to the family Pentanchidae, the deepwater catsharks. A small, slim-bodied shark reaching 37 cm (15 in) in length, it has a distinctive color pattern of narrow, dark brown vertical bars, which resemble those of the extinct quagga. Its head is short and flattened, with a pointed snout tip that is not upturned.

Little is known of the quagga catshark's natural history, as it is known only from nine specimens caught off southwestern India and eastern Somalia. Inhabiting the offshore waters of continental shelf at depths of 59–220 m (194–722 ft) or more, it is a bottom-dwelling predator of shrimps. It exhibits an oviparous mode of reproduction, with a record of a female containing eight eggs that were enclosed in brown capsules bearing long tendrils at the corners. The International Union for Conservation of Nature (IUCN) presently lacks sufficient data to assess the conservation status of this species. It is not economically valued but is taken as bycatch.

== Taxonomy ==
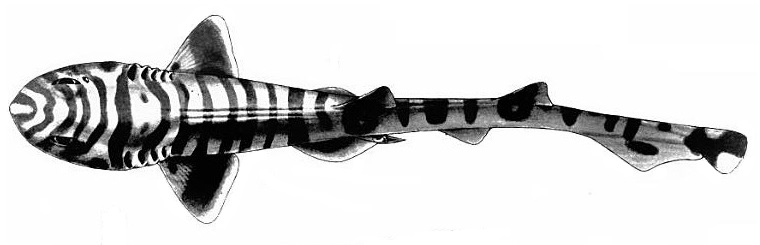
Drawing of the quagga catshark type specimen from Illustrations of the Zoology of the Royal Indian Marine Survey Ship Investigator (1900), which complemented Alcock's description.

The first specimen of the quagga catshark was a 27 cm (11 in) long adult male collected by the paddle steamer RIMS Investigator from a depth of 187 m (614 ft) off the Malabar Coast of India. It was described by British naturalist Alfred William Alcock in A Descriptive Catalogue of the Indian Deep-sea Fishes in the Indian Museum, published in 1899. He assigned the new species to the genus Scyllium (a synonym of Scyliorhinus) and named it after the quagga (Equus quagga quagga) because of their similar color patterns. Later authors moved this species to the genus Halaelurus.

Only nine quagga catshark specimens have been recorded. In addition to Alcock's type specimen, four males were trawled from off the eastern Somali coast by the research ship RV Anton Bruun in 1964. Four more individuals, two male and two female, were found amongst the contents of commercial fishing trawls conducted off Quilon, India in 2010. A male specimen reported from the Gulf of Aden in 1939 was later re-identified as a speckled catshark (H. boesemani).

== Description ==
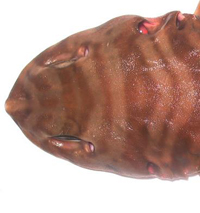
Indian specimen of a quagga catshark, showing the dorsally positioned eyes and gill slits, and the non-upturned snout tip.

Slender and firm-bodied, the quagga catshark has a short and flattened head with a pointed snout. The slightly protruding tip of the snout is not upturned like in some other Halaelurus species. The anterior rims of the nostrils bear triangular flaps of skin. The small, horizontally oval eyes are placed high on the head and have rudimentary nictitating membranes; below the eyes are thick ridges, and behind them are tiny spiracles. The rather large mouth is curved, with the upper teeth exposed when closed. There are short furrows at the corners of the mouth. The jaws contain 26–28 upper and 27 lower tooth rows on each side; in addition, there are three tooth rows at the upper symphysis (jaw midpoint) and one row at the lower. The teeth have three cusps. The five pairs of gill slits are placed higher than the level of the mouth; the fifth pair are smaller than the rest.

The moderately large and rounded pectoral fins are positioned fairly close to the pelvic fins. Adult males have thin, tapering claspers with a denticle-covered knob on the outer side near the tip. The first dorsal fin is placed just behind the pelvic fin bases, while the larger second dorsal fin is placed just behind the anal fin. The anal fin is larger than the second dorsal fin and comparable in size to the pelvic fins. The caudal fin has a small but discernible lower lobe and a large upper lobe with a notch in its trailing margin. The thick skin is covered by dermal denticles, which have arrowhead-shaped crowns with a central ridge and three posterior teeth. This shark has a striking dorsal color pattern consisting of over 20 narrow, dark brown vertical bars on a light brown background; the bars run from the head to the tail and extend onto the dorsal fins. The underside is off-white, and the pectoral, pelvic, and anal fins have pale trailing margins. The largest known specimen is 37 cm (15 in) long.

== Distribution and habitat ==
The known specimens of the quagga catshark have been collected from the Laccadive Sea off southwestern India and from the Indian Ocean off Somalia. The Indian sharks were caught between the depths of 90 and 220 m (300 and 720 ft) or possibly 280 m (920 ft), while the Somalian sharks were caught at depths of 59 to 70 m (194 to 230 ft). This is a bottom-dwelling species found far from shore over the continental shelf.

== Biology and ecology ==
The diet of the quagga catshark consists of deep-living shrimps. Its reproduction is oviparous like the other members of its genus. One of the female Indian specimens was gravid with eight eggs, divided evenly between the two oviducts. The eggs are enclosed in brown purse-shaped capsules measuring 3.8–4.0 cm (1.5–1.6 in) in length, with long coiled tendrils at their four corners. The smallest known specimen is 8 cm (3.1 in) long, which is probably close to the size at hatching. Males reach sexual maturity at between 28 and 35 cm (11 and 14 in) long; female maturation size is unknown.

== Human interactions ==
The quagga catshark is harmless and is not utilized by humans. It is caught incidentally by demersal fisheries in bottom trawls and potentially other gear; such fishing activity is very intense in Indian and Somalian waters, though specific data on this species is lacking. Therefore, the International Union for Conservation of Nature (IUCN) has listed it as Data Deficient.
