= Natal shyshark =

Conservation status
- Vulnerable (IUCN 3.1)

Scientific classification
- Kingdom: Animalia
- Phylum: Chordata
- Class: Chondrichthyes
- Subclass: Elasmobranchii
- Division: Selachii
- Order: Carcharhiniformes
- Family: Pentanchidae
- Genus: Haploblepharus
- Species: H. kistnasamyi

Binomial name
- Haploblepharus kistnasamyi Human & Compagno, 2006
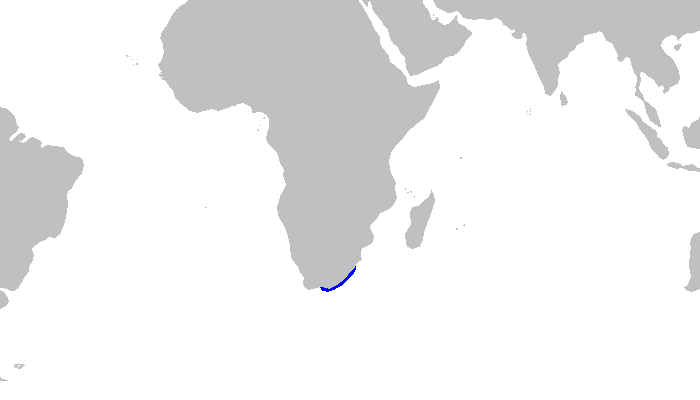
- Range of the Natal shyshark

Species of shark

The Natal shyshark, eastern shyshark or happy chappie (Haploblepharus kistnasamyi) is a species of shark belonging to the family Pentanchidae, the deepwater catsharks. It was once regarded as the "Natal" form of the puffadder shyshark (H. edwardsii). This shark is endemic to a small area off South Africa from the Western Cape to KwaZulu-Natal. It is found close to the coast, from the surf zone to a depth of 30 m (98 ft), and has benthic habits. Reaching 50 cm (20 in) in length, the Natal shyshark is similar to the puffadder shyshark in appearance but has a stockier body, less flattened head, a compressed caudal peduncle, and a different color pattern. Rare and under threat from habitat degradation and commercial fishing, it has been assessed as Vulnerable by the International Union for Conservation of Nature (IUCN).

== Taxonomy ==
This species was once considered to be the "Natal" form of the puffadder shyshark, which differed from the main "Cape" form in appearance and habitat preferences. In 2006, Brett A. Human and Leonard J.V. Compagno formally described this shark as a new species, in an article published in the scientific journal Zootaxa. They named it after South African shark researcher Nat Kistnasamy, the Natal shyshark's original discoverer.

== Distribution and habitat ==
The distribution of the Natal shyshark is restricted to the waters off the KwaZulu-Natal, and possibly also the Western Cape and Eastern Cape Provinces of South Africa. Its total range is estimated to encompass an area of under 100 km^{2} (39 mi^{2}). A benthic species, it can be found in the surf zone and on shallow rocky reefs. As opposed to the puffadder shyshark, which inhabits deeper, cooler waters in the northeastern parts of its range, in those areas the Natal shyshark occurs in warm inshore waters at a depth of 0–30 m (0–98 ft).

== Description ==
The Natal shyshark closely resembles the puffadder shyshark, but has a more robust body, a less flattened head, and a laterally compressed caudal peduncle. The snout is broad and rounded, with very large nostrils and greatly expanded, triangular nasal skin flaps that reach the mouth. There are a pair of deep grooves, covered by the nasal flaps, that run from the excurrent (outflow) openings of the nostrils to the mouth. The mouth has furrows at the corners on both jaws, and contains teeth with 3–5 points. The eyes are large, with a rudimentary nictitating membrane (protective third eyelid) and a prominent ridge beneath. The five gill slits are positioned somewhat dorsally on the body.

The dorsal, pelvic, and anal fins are of roughly equal size. The dorsal fins are placed far back on the body, with the first originating behind the pelvic fin origins and the second originating behind the anal fin origins. The pectoral fins are moderately large. The short and broad caudal fin has a ventral notch on the upper lobe and an indistinct lower lobe. The skin is thick, bearing well-calcified leaf-shaped dermal denticles. The back is brown, with a distinctive pattern of H-shaped, dark brown saddles with well-defined margins, along with numerous small white dots and darker mottling between the saddles. This species attains a length of 50 cm (20 in).

== Biology and ecology ==
The Natal shyshark is rarer than the puffadder shyshark and little is known of its habits. Males are sexually mature at around 50 cm (20 in) long, and females at 48 cm (19 in) long. The shysharks are so named because they curl into a ring and cover their eyes with their tails when threatened.

== Human interactions ==
The highly restricted range of the Natal shyshark is threatened by habitat degradation from coastal development, particularly in the vicinity of Durban where industrial and tourism sectors have undergone rapid expansion. Furthermore, the region is subject to heavy fishing pressure, in particular from the commercial prawn fishery. Given its localized occurrence and presumably small population, this species has been assessed as Vulnerable by the International Union for Conservation of Nature (IUCN).
