= Rusty catshark =

Conservation status
- Least Concern (IUCN 3.1)

Scientific classification
- Kingdom: Animalia
- Phylum: Chordata
- Class: Chondrichthyes
- Subclass: Elasmobranchii
- Division: Selachii
- Order: Carcharhiniformes
- Family: Pentanchidae
- Genus: Halaelurus
- Species: H. sellus

Binomial name
- Halaelurus sellus W. T. White, Last & Stevens, 2007

Species of shark

The rusty catshark (Halaelurus sellus) is a species of shark belonging to the family Pentanchidae, the deepwater catsharks. It is a tropical catshark found around the waters off Australia, in the eastern Indian Ocean. It was named by W.T. White, P.R. Last, and J.D. Stevens in 2007. Male Halaelurus sellus can reach a maximum length of 35.3 centimetres, while females can reach a maximum length of 42.3 centimetres.
