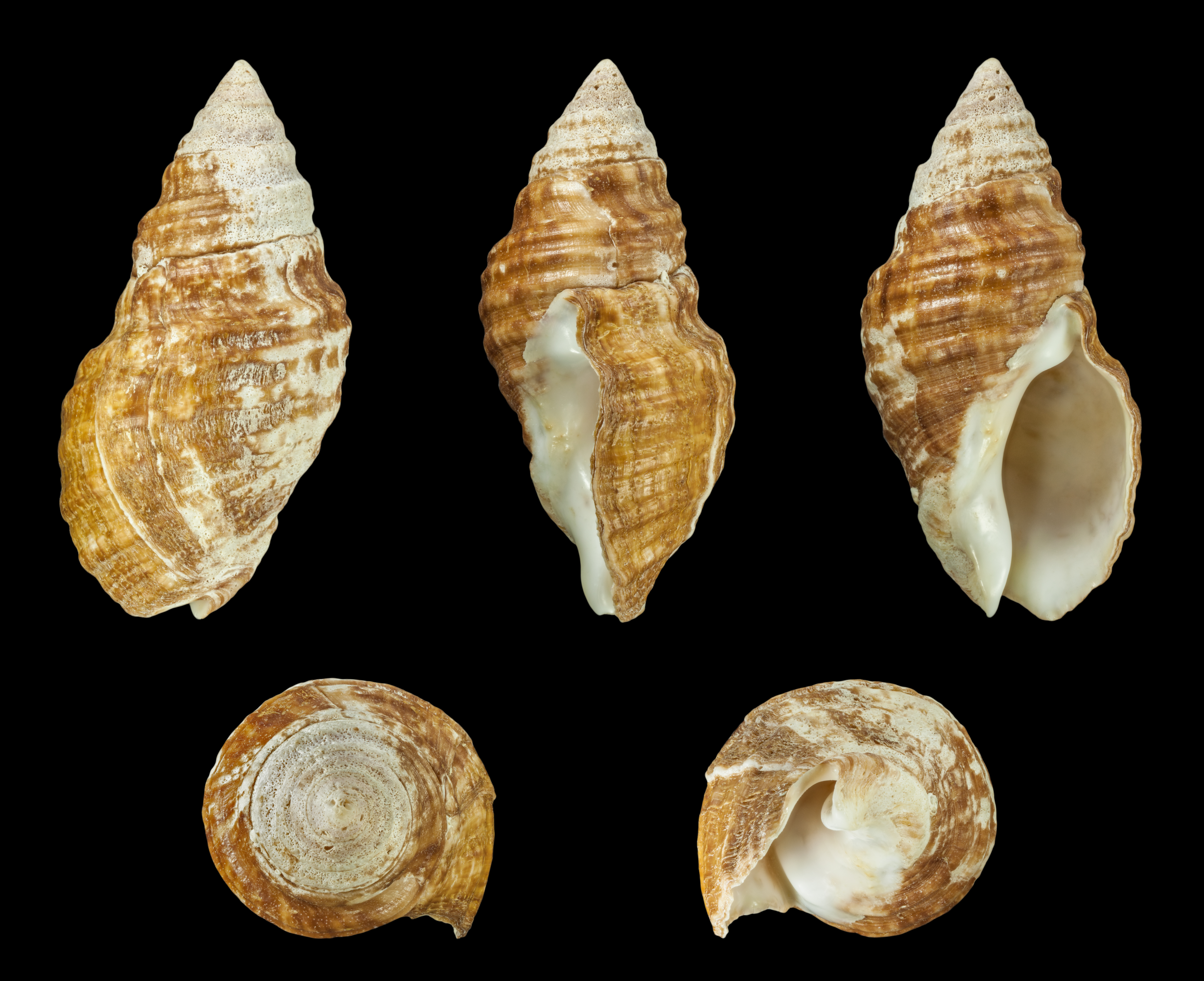

Scientific classification
- Kingdom: Animalia
- Phylum: Mollusca
- Class: Gastropoda
- Subclass: Caenogastropoda
- Order: Neogastropoda
- Family: incertae sedis
- Genus: Burnupena
- Species: B. cincta

Binomial name
- Burnupena cincta (Röding, 1798)

Synonyms
- Burnupena cincta f. semisulcata Sowerby III, 1892; Cominella cincta (Röding, 1798)

= Burnupena cincta =

Species of gastropod

Burnupena cincta, common name the ridged burnupena, is a species of sea snail, a marine gastropod mollusc.

Subspecies

- Burnupena cincta cincta (Röding, 1798) (synonyms: Buccinum cinctum Röding, 1798 (basionym); Cominella cincta var. adjacens Turton, 1932; Cominella dunkeri Kobelt, 1878; Cominella semisulcata G.B. Sowerby III, 1892; Purpura ligata Lamarck, 1822)
- Burnupena cincta limbosa (Lamarck, 1822) (synonyms: Burnupena limbosa (Lamarck, 1822); Cominella porcata multilirata Bartsch, 1915; Purpura limbosa Lamarck, 1822 (basionym) )
