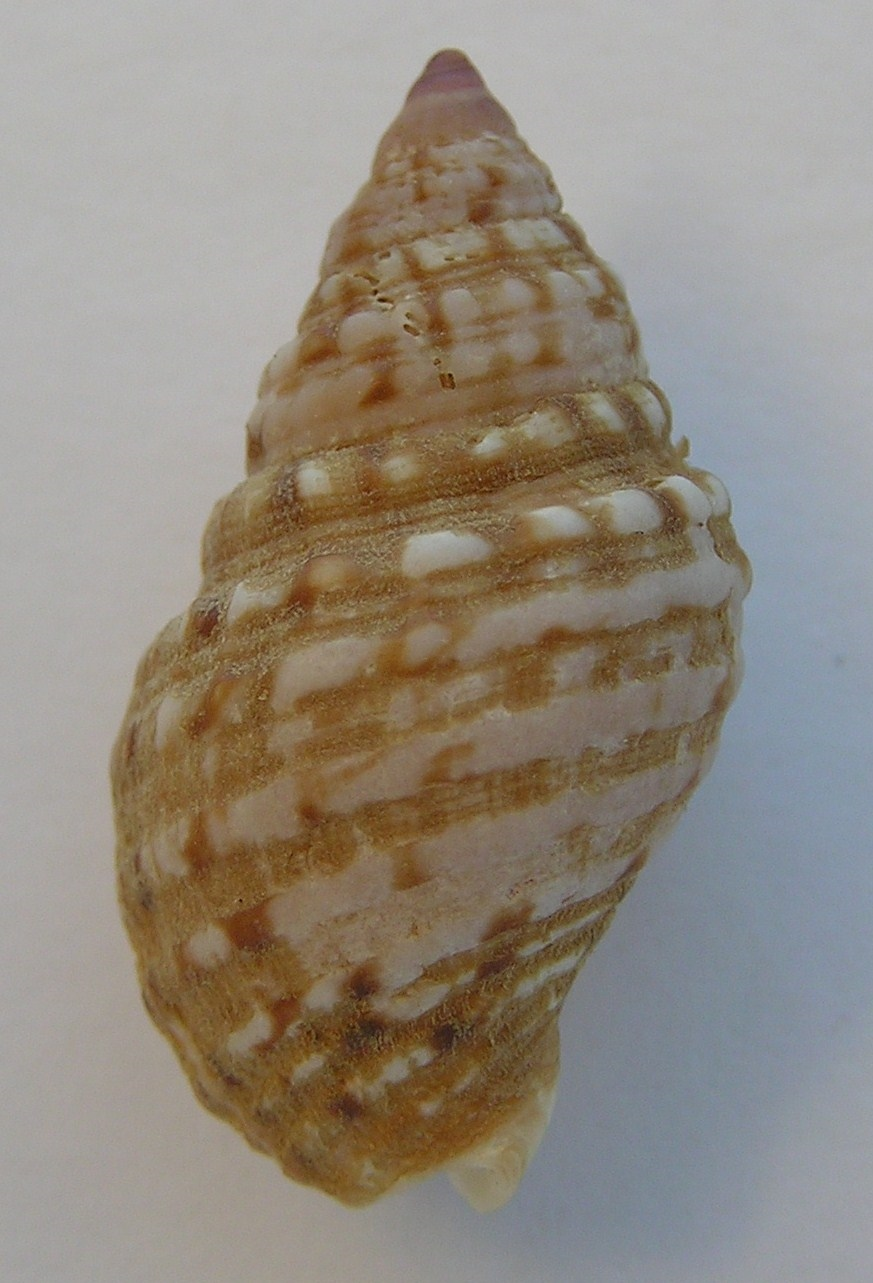
- Burnupena pubescens

Scientific classification
- Kingdom: Animalia
- Phylum: Mollusca
- Class: Gastropoda
- Subclass: Caenogastropoda
- Order: Neogastropoda
- Family: incertae sedis
- Genus: Burnupena; Iredale, 1918

Type species
- Buccinum porcatum Gmelin, 1791

= Burnupena =

Genus of gastropods

Burnupena is a genus of sea snails, marine gastropod mollusks in the superfamily Buccinoidea.

== Species ==
Species within the genus Burnupena include:

- Burnupena catarrhacta (Gmelin, 1791)
- Burnupena cincta (Röding, 1798)
- Burnupena denseliriata Dempster & Branch, 1999
- Burnupena lagenaria (Lamarck, 1822)
- Burnupena papyracea (Bruguière, 1789)
- Burnupena pubescens (Küster, 1858)
- Burnupena rotunda Dempster & Branch, 1999

Species brought into synonymy

- Burnupena delalandii (Kiener, 1834): synonym of Burnupena catarrhacta (Gmelin, 1791)
- Burnupena dunkeri] (Küster, 1858): synonym of Burnupena catarrhacta (Gmelin, 1791)
- Burnupena limbosa (Lamarck, 1822): synonym of Burnupena cincta limbosa (Lamarck, 1822)
- Burnupena tigrina (Kiener, 1834): synonym of Burnupena pubescens (Küster, 1858)
