= Indonesian speckled catshark =

Conservation status
- Near Threatened (IUCN 3.1)

Scientific classification
- Kingdom: Animalia
- Phylum: Chordata
- Class: Chondrichthyes
- Subclass: Elasmobranchii
- Division: Selachii
- Order: Carcharhiniformes
- Family: Pentanchidae
- Genus: Halaelurus
- Species: H. maculosus

Binomial name
- Halaelurus maculosus W. T. White, Last & Stevens, 2007

Species of shark

The Indonesian speckled catshark (Halaelurus maculosus) is a species of shark belonging to the family Pentanchidae, the deepwater catsharks. It is a tropical catshark found in the Pacific Ocean. It was named by W. T. White, P. R. Last, and J. D. Stevens in 2007. Male Halaelurus maculosus can reach a maximum length of 45.7 centimetres (18.0 in), while females can reach a maximum length of 52.8 centimetres (20.8 in). Catsharks in this species are occasionally caught by demersal fisheries.
