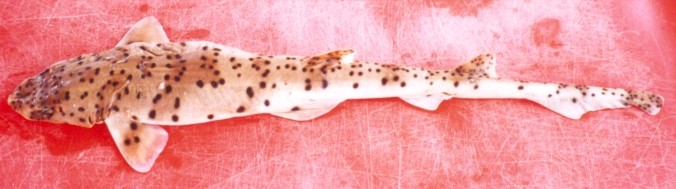

Conservation status
- Endangered (IUCN 3.1)

Scientific classification
- Kingdom: Animalia
- Phylum: Chordata
- Class: Chondrichthyes
- Subclass: Elasmobranchii
- Division: Selachii
- Order: Carcharhiniformes
- Family: Pentanchidae
- Genus: Halaelurus
- Species: H. buergeri

Binomial name
- Halaelurus buergeri (J. P. Müller & Henle, 1838)
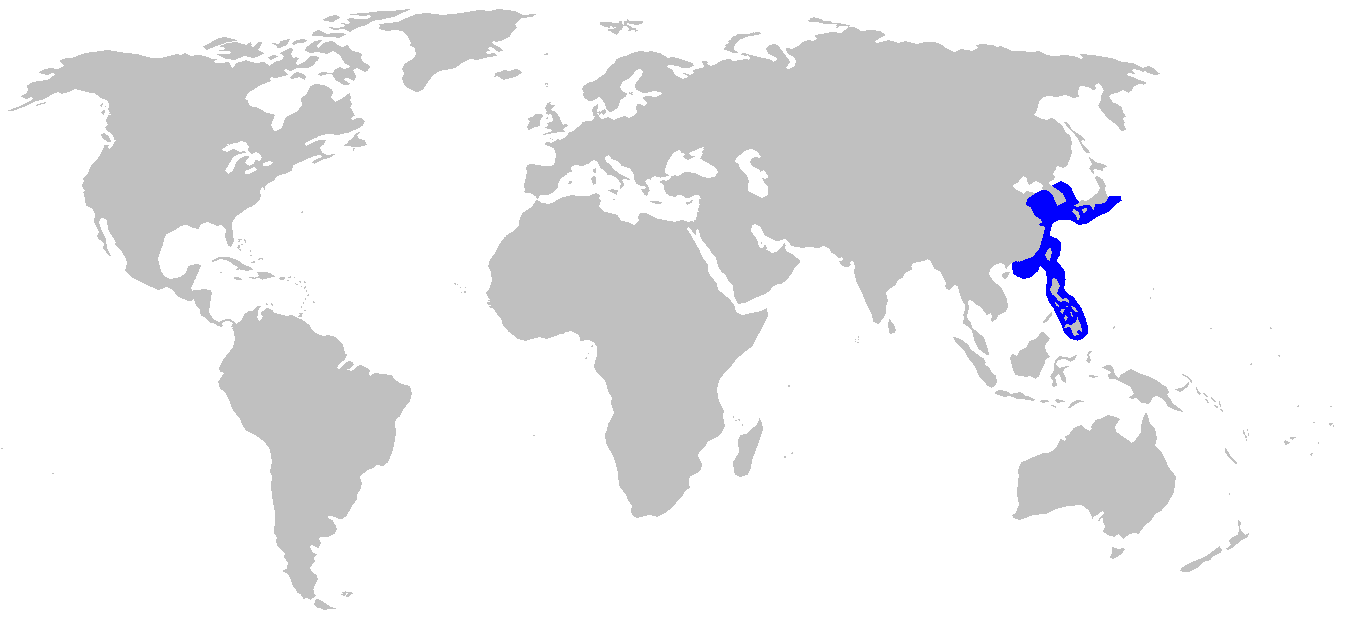

= Blackspotted catshark =

Species of shark

The blackspotted catshark (Halaelurus buergeri) is a species of shark belonging to the family Pentanchidae, the deepwater catsharks. It is found in the waters off the coasts of Japan, Korea, China, and Taiwan between latitudes 39° N and 20° N, at the depths of between 80 and 100 m. It can grow up to 49 cm in length.

== Description ==
The blackspotted catshark has the appearance of a member of the catshark family, with a cylindrical and slender body, two dorsal fins of equal size, and a smaller anal fin. The body of the blackspotted catshark is thick-skinned and usually a light beige or dark grey color, with distinctive dark spots covering the entire body as well as the fins. Saddles on the side are not prominent, though darker in color compared to the rest of the body.

The head is rounded and has a slight indentation, with a short snout. This species does not have barbels.

== Geographical distribution ==
The blackspotted catshark is native to Japan, China, Korea, Taiwan and the Philippines. Their range is confined to the Pacific Ocean as far south as Western Australia, where they are considered a common inshore catshark. There has been some controversy over sightings of the blackspotted catshark in Northern Australia and Queensland, however Whitley (1940) and McKay (1966) noted that recorded sightings were untrue.

== Habitat and biology ==
Blackspotted catsharks are usually on the continental shelf in depths of up to 4 meters.

== Mating and reproduction ==
The blackspotted catshark is oviparous, with eggs remaining in the oviduct until hatching. Leonard Compagno, a shark taxonomist, noted that females have been known to deposit between 6-12 egg cases.

== Interest to fisheries ==
There is no interest to fisheries at the present time, though the IUCN Red List of Threatened Species noted that the blackspotted catshark could be caught during demersal trawling (bottom trawling).
