= Lined catshark =

Conservation status
- Least Concern (IUCN 3.1)

Scientific classification
- Kingdom: Animalia
- Phylum: Chordata
- Class: Chondrichthyes
- Subclass: Elasmobranchii
- Division: Selachii
- Order: Carcharhiniformes
- Family: Pentanchidae
- Genus: Halaelurus
- Species: H. lineatus

Binomial name
- Halaelurus lineatus Bass, D'Aubrey & Kistnasamy, 1975
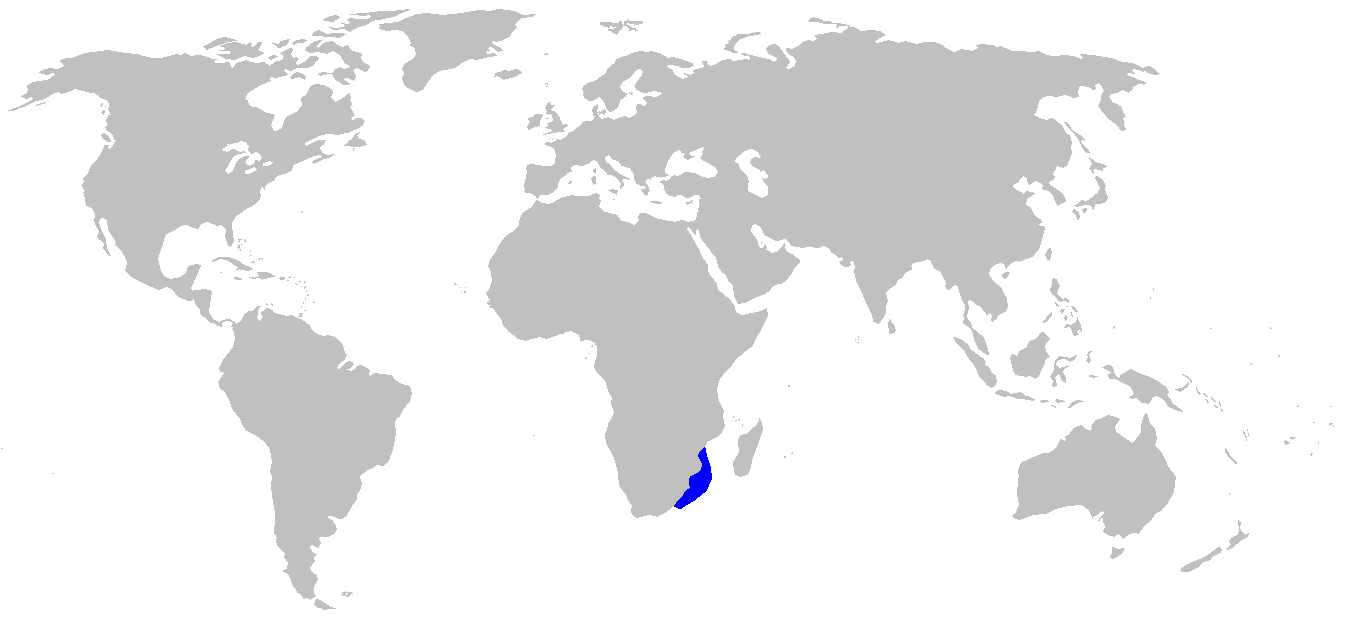
- Range of the lined catshark

Species of shark

The lined catshark or banded catshark (Halaelurus lineatus) is a species of shark belonging to the family Pentanchidae, the deepwater catsharks. It is found in the waters off the coasts of Beira, Mozambique, to East London, and South Africa between latitudes 19°S and 31°S, from the surface to 290 m. It can grow up to 56 cm in length.
