= Speckled catshark =

Conservation status
- Vulnerable (IUCN 3.1)

Scientific classification
- Kingdom: Animalia
- Phylum: Chordata
- Class: Chondrichthyes
- Subclass: Elasmobranchii
- Division: Selachii
- Order: Carcharhiniformes
- Family: Pentanchidae
- Genus: Halaelurus
- Species: H. boesemani

Binomial name
- Halaelurus boesemani S. Springer & D'Aubrey, 1972
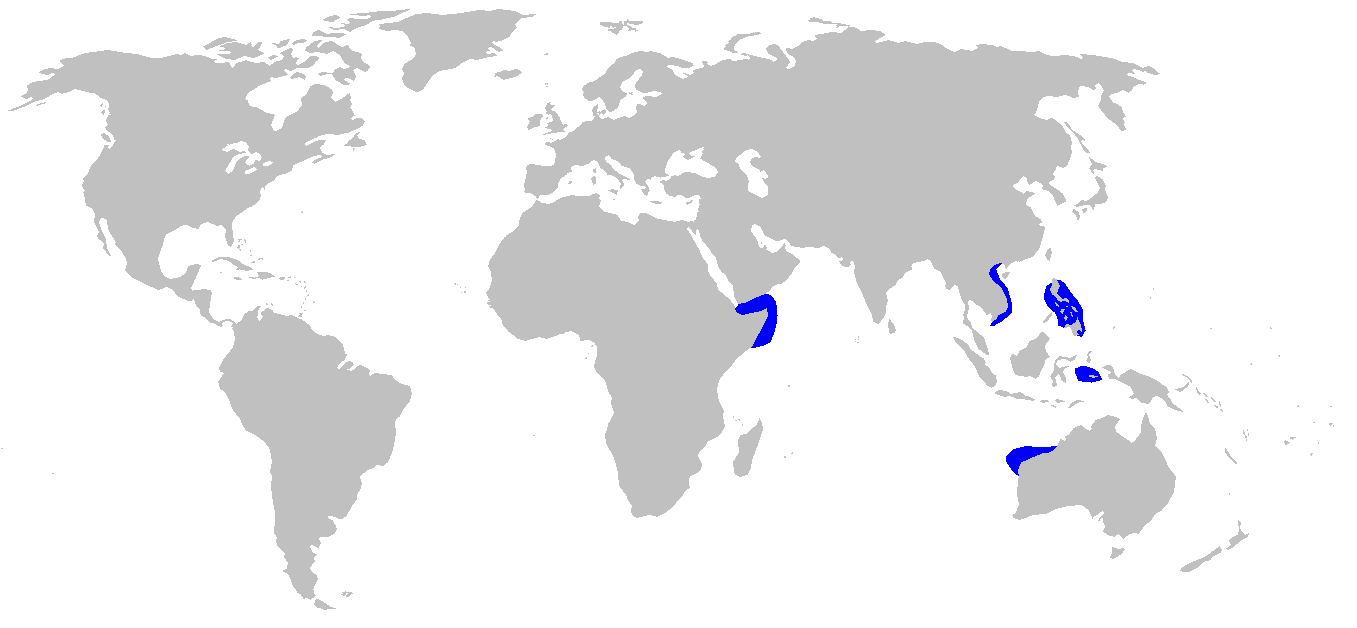

Species of shark

The speckled catshark (Halaelurus boesemani) is a species of shark belonging to the family Pentanchidae, the deepwater catsharks. It is found in the Gulf of Aden and off the coast of Somalia. It occurs at depths of between 37 and 250 m (120 and 820 ft). Its length is up to 48 cm.

== Taxonomy ==
In the past, this species was thought to occur both in the western Indian Ocean and in the waters around Vietnam, the Philippines, Indonesia, and Western Australia, between latitudes 21° N and 26° S. However, two new species of Halaelurus have been described from these latter areas, and the speckled catshark is now thought to be restricted to the western Indian Ocean.

== Description ==
The speckled catshark grows to a maximum length of about 48 cm (19 in). It has a pointed snout, small mouth and raised gill slits. The front of the first dorsal fin is situated above the hind third of the pelvic fin, while the front of the second dorsal fin, which is about the same size as the first, is situated above the hind third of the anal fin. The back and the base of the tail have about eight irregular, dark saddle-shaped markings, and there are dark blotches on the dorsal and caudal fins and many small dark spots on the back, flanks and fins.

== Distribution and habitat ==
The speckled catshark is known from the Gulf of Aden, and off the coast of Somalia, with a separate population extending from Viet Nam and the Philippines, through Indonesia to Western Australia. It is a demersal species, living on continental shelves and insular shelves, with a depth range of between 37 and 250 m (120 and 820 ft).

== Ecology ==
The reproduction of this species of shark has been little studied. Four eggcases have been found inside the oviduct of a female but it is unclear whether the eggs hatch internally, or the cases are deposited onto the seabed and the eggs develop there. The length of the juvenile at birth/hatching is 7 cm (2.8 in) or more.

== Status ==
The speckled catshark is poorly researched and the threats it faces are unclear. Fisheries in Somalia are largely unregulated, with foreign-owned vessels fishing illegally. Artisanal fisheries are unlikely to target this species because of its small size, nevertheless it is vulnerable to being caught as bycatch in both trawling and netting operations. The International Union for Conservation of Nature considers that there is insufficient evidence to understand the conservation needs of this fish and have classified it as "vulnerable".
