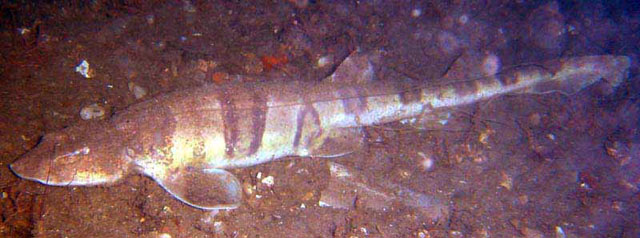
- Tiger catshark (Halaelurus natalensis)

Scientific classification
- Kingdom: Animalia
- Phylum: Chordata
- Class: Chondrichthyes
- Subclass: Elasmobranchii
- Division: Selachii
- Order: Carcharhiniformes
- Family: Pentanchidae
- Genus: Halaelurus; T. N. Gill, 1862

Type species
- Scyllium buergeri J. P. Müller & Henle, 1841

= Halaelurus =

Genus of sharks

Halaelurus is a genus of catsharks in the family Pentanchidae.

== Species ==
- Halaelurus boesemani S. Springer & D'Aubrey, 1972 (speckled catshark)
- Halaelurus buergeri (J. P. Müller & Henle, 1838) (blackspotted catshark)
- Halaelurus lineatus Bass, D'Aubrey & Kistnasamy, 1975 (lined catshark)
- Halaelurus maculosus W. T. White, Last & Stevens, 2007 (Indonesian speckled catshark)
- Halaelurus natalensis (Regan, 1904) (tiger catshark)
- Halaelurus quagga (Alcock, 1899) (quagga catshark)
- Halaelurus sellus W. T. White, Last & Stevens, 2007 (rusty catshark)
