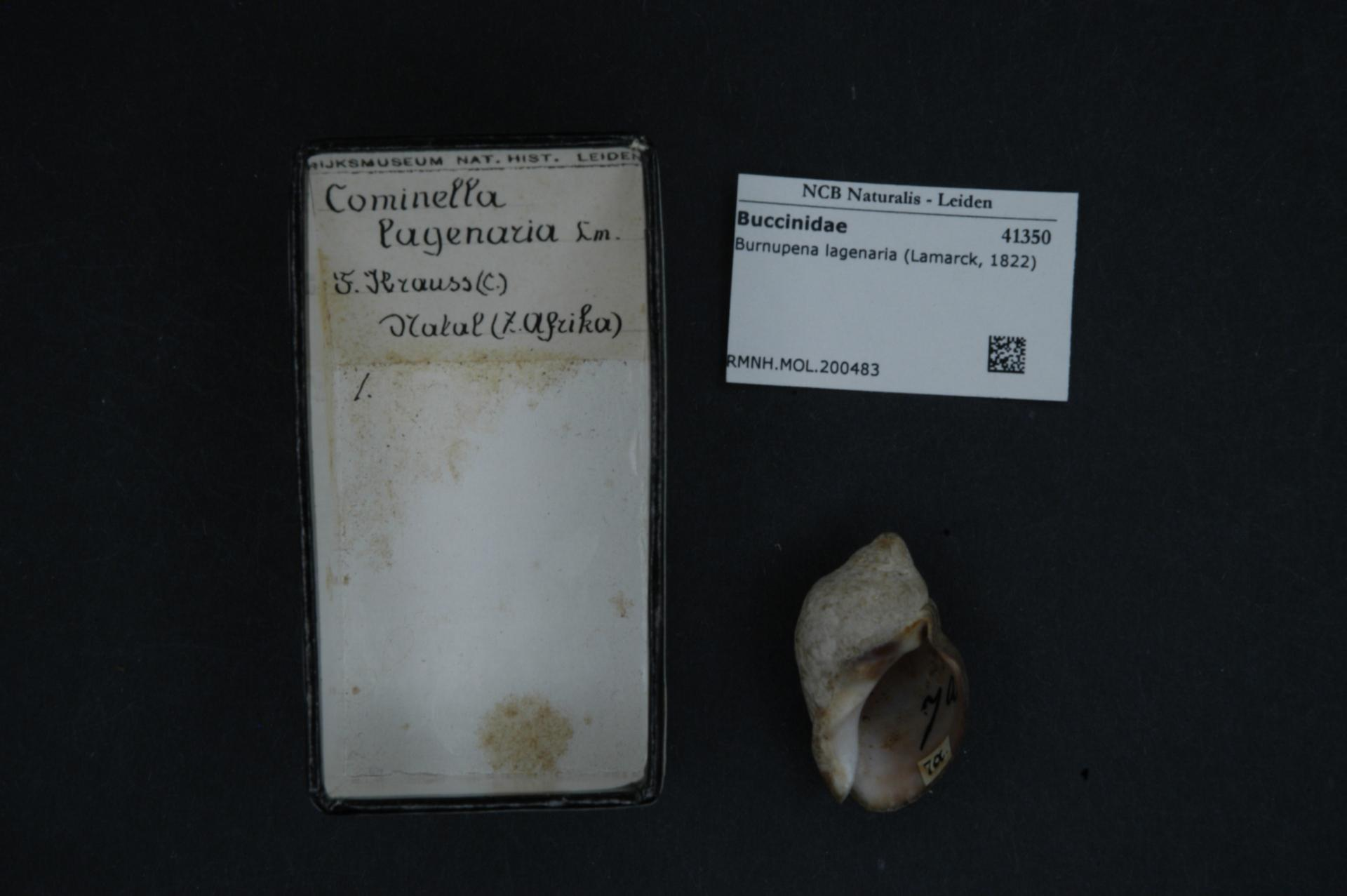
- Burnupena lagenaria shell

Scientific classification
- Kingdom: Animalia
- Phylum: Mollusca
- Class: Gastropoda
- Subclass: Caenogastropoda
- Order: Neogastropoda
- Family: incertae sedis
- Genus: Burnupena
- Species: B. lagenaria

Binomial name
- Burnupena lagenaria (Lamarck, 1822)

= Burnupena lagenaria =

Species of gastropod

Burnupena lagenaria is a species of sea snail, a marine gastropod mollusc.
