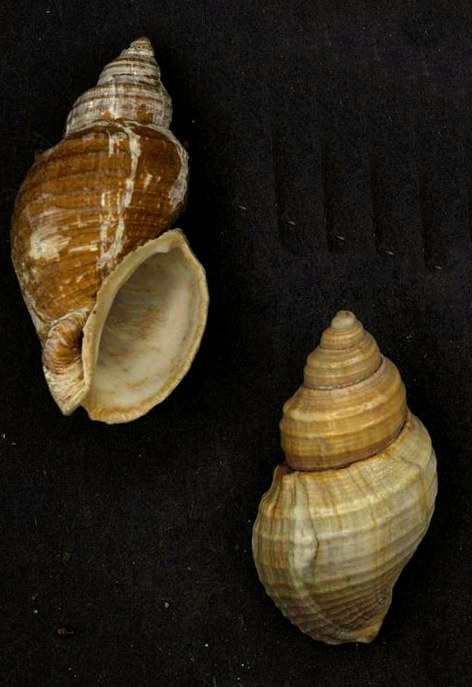
- Two views of a shell of Burnupena papyracea (museum specimens at Naturalis Biodiversity Center)

Scientific classification
- Kingdom: Animalia
- Phylum: Mollusca
- Class: Gastropoda
- Subclass: Caenogastropoda
- Order: Neogastropoda
- Family: incertae sedis
- Genus: Burnupena
- Species: B. papyracea

Binomial name
- Burnupena papyracea (Bruguière, 1789)

Synonyms
- Buccinum anglicanum Gmelin, 1791; Buccinum britanicum Röding, 1798; Buccinum intinctum Reeve, 1846; Buccinum norvegicum Lamarck, 1816; Buccinum papyraceum Bruguière, 1789 (basionym); Burnupena papyracea f. anglicanum (Gmelin, 1791); Burnupena papyracea papyracea (Bruguière, 1789) · accepted, alternate representation

= Burnupena papyracea =

Species of gastropod

Burnupena papyracea, common name the papery burnupena, is a species of sea snail, a marine gastropod mollusc.

== Description ==
The length of the shell attains 60 mm,

The oblong, conical shell is rather thin. It is of a reddish-brown color, covered transversely with striae and ridges, with some slightly apparent longitudinal striae. The transverse ridges are raised and very prominent. The spire is elongated and contains seven whorls. These are convex and depressed at their upper part. The body whorl is longer than all the others together. The aperture is elongated, ovate, of a reddish yellow, and slightly emarginated at its base. The outer lip is thin, forming at its upper and internal part a sort of small canal at its union with the left lip. The columella is almost straight, subverrucose, and of a reddish yellow.

The shell is dull brown with fine ridges along the spirals and a papery outer layer that peels off when dead, but in life is usually encrusted by the commensal bryozoan Alcyonidium nodosum which gives a slightly nodular velvety appearance in purplish to orangy browns Easily confused in the field with B. pubescens, which does not reach the same maximum size.

== Distribution ==
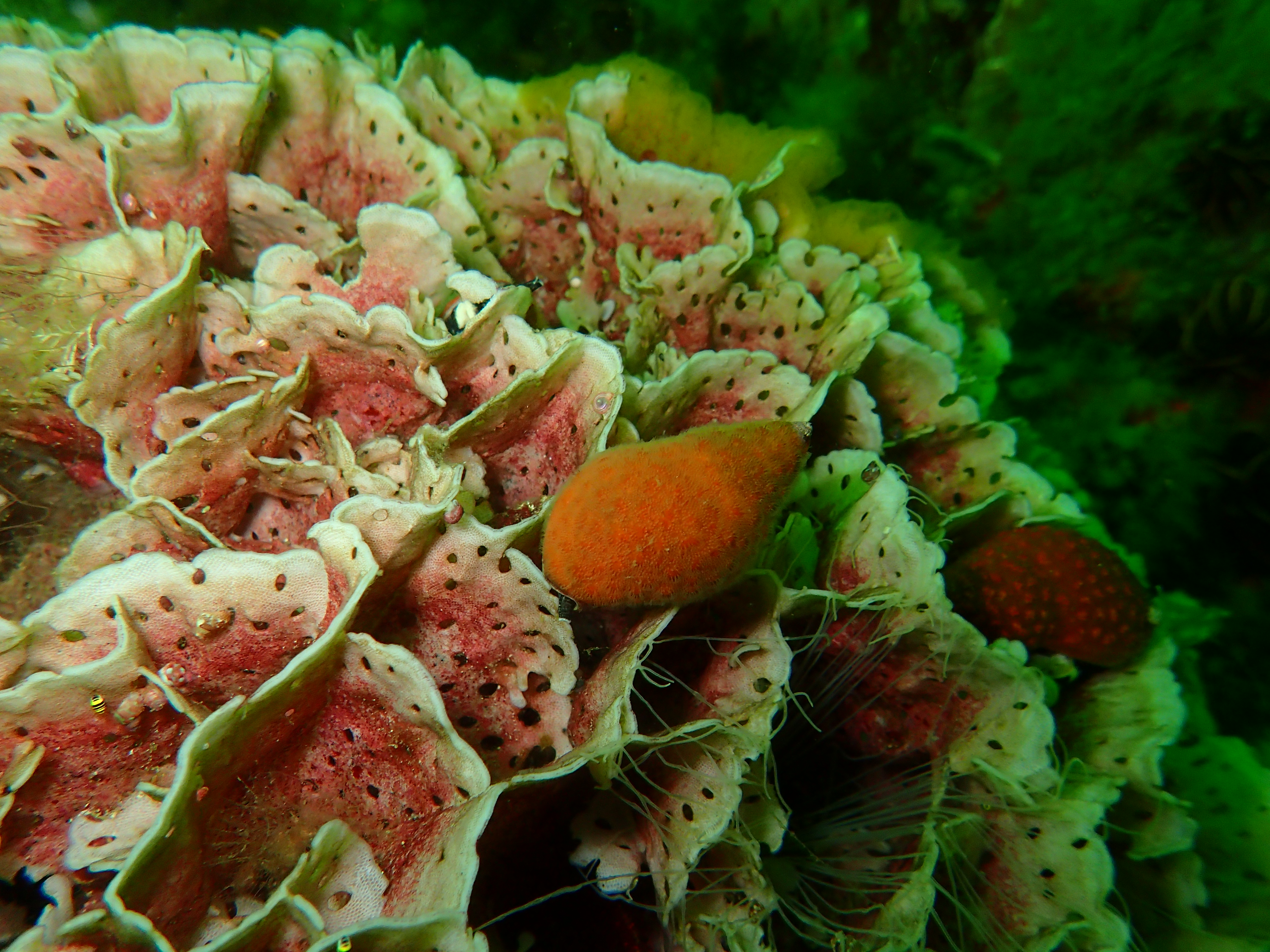
Papery burnupena on lacy false coral at the Drop Zone in False Bay

This marine species occurs off the west coast of South Africa from Namibia to Hermanus, subtidally to 37m, Endemic.
