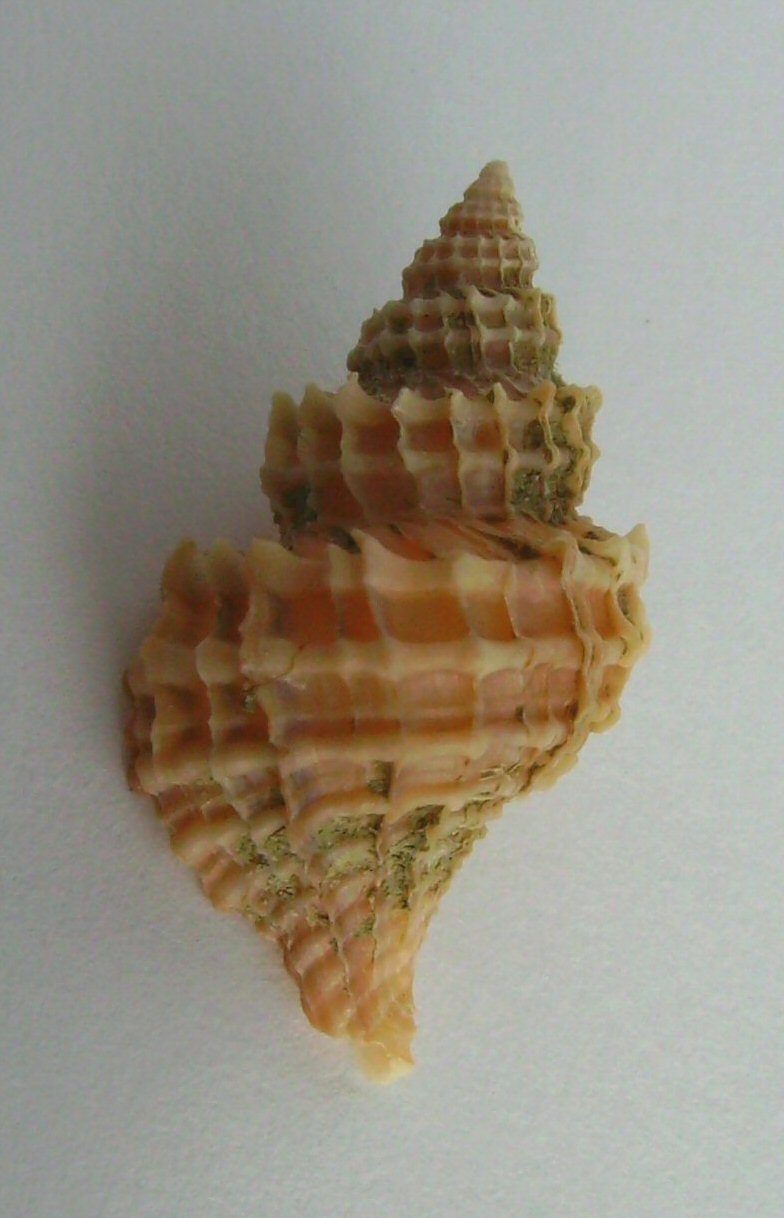
- Xymene ambiguus

Scientific classification
- Kingdom: Animalia
- Phylum: Mollusca
- Class: Gastropoda
- Subclass: Caenogastropoda
- Order: Neogastropoda
- Family: Muricidae
- Subfamily: Pagodulinae
- Genus: Xymene; Iredale, 1915

Type species
- Fusus plebeius Hutton, 1873

Species
- See text

Synonyms
- Axymene Finlay, 1926; Kalydon Hutton, 1873 (Invalid: Placed on the Official Index by ICZN Opinion 911); Lenitrophon Finlay, 1926; Trophon (Kalydon); Xymenella Finlay, 1926; Zeatrophon Finlay, 1926

= Xymene =

Genus of gastropods

Xymene is a genus of predatory sea snails, marine gastropod molluscs in the family Muricidae, the rock snails, found in New Zealand.

== Species ==
Species and subspecies within the genus Xymene include:

- Xymene convexus (Suter, 1909)
- Xymene erectus (Suter, 1909)
- Xymene huttoni (Murdoch, 1900)
- Xymene plebeius (Hutton, 1873)
- Xymene pumilus (Suter, 1909)
- Xymene teres (Finlay, 1930)
- Xymene warreni Ponder, 1972

Species brought into synonymy

- Xymene ambiguus (Philippi, 1844): synonym of Zeatrophon ambiguus (Philippi, 1844)
- Xymene aucklandicus (E. A. Smith, 1902): synonym of Axymene aucklandicus (E. A. Smith, 1902)
- Xymene gouldi (Cossmann, 1903): synonym of Fuegotrophon pallidus (Broderip, 1833)
- Xymene inferus (Hutton, 1878): synonym of Xymene plebeius (Hutton, 1873)
- Xymene mortenseni (Odhner, 1924): synonym of Zeatrophon mortenseni (Odhner, 1924)
- Xymene oliveri Marwick, 1924: synonym of Xymene pusillus (Suter, 1907)
- Xymene pulcherrimus (Finlay, 1930): synonym of Zeatrophon pulcherrimus Finlay, 1930
- Xymene pusillus (Suter, 1907): synonym of Xymenella pusilla (Suter, 1907)
- Xymene quirindus Iredale, 1915: synonym of Xymene traversi (Hutton, 1873)
- Xymene robustus Finlay, 1924: synonym of Xymene pumilus (Suter, 1909)
- Xymene traversi (Hutton, 1873): synonym of Axymene traversi (Hutton, 1873)
