= Axymene =

Scientific classification
- Kingdom: Animalia
- Phylum: Mollusca
- Class: Gastropoda
- Subclass: Caenogastropoda
- Order: Neogastropoda
- Family: Muricidae
- Subfamily: Pagudilinae
- Genus: Axymene; Finlay, 1926

Type species
- Axymene turbator Finlay, 1926

Genus of gastropods

Axymene is a genus of sea snails, marine gastropod mollusks in the family Muricidae, the murex snails or rock snails.

== Species ==
Species within the genus Axymene include:

- Axymene aucklandicus (E. A. Smith, 1902)

Species brought into synonymy

- Axymene philippinensis Petuch, 1979: synonym of Preangeria dentata (Schepman, 1911)
- Axymene teres Finlay, 1930: synonym of Xymene teres (Finlay, 1930)
- Axymene traversi (Hutton, 1873): synonym of Lamellitrophon traversi (F. W. Hutton, 1873)
- Axymene turbator Finlay, 1926: synonym of Axymene aucklandicus (E. A. Smith, 1902)
