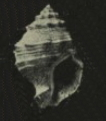
- Shell of † Austrofusus gamma (holotype)

Scientific classification
- Kingdom: Animalia
- Phylum: Mollusca
- Class: Gastropoda
- Subclass: Caenogastropoda
- Order: Neogastropoda
- Family: Prosiphonidae
- Genus: Austrofusus
- Species: †A. gamma

Binomial name
- †Austrofusus gamma H. J. Finlay, 1926

Synonyms
- † Austrofusus (Neocola) gamma H. J. Finlay, 1926 alternative representation

= Austrofusus gamma =

Species of gastropod

Austrofusus gamma is an extinct species of medium-sized sea snail or whelk, a marine gastropod mollusc in the family Prosiphonidae.

== Description ==
The type specimen stands at a height of 23 mm with a diameter of 15 mm, while the paratype reaches a height of 26 mm with a diameter of 15 mm.

(Original description) The tendency toward a prickly sculpture, which was manifest on the middle whorls of Austrofusus alpha and Austrofusus beta has here continued even through the formation of the body whorl. This whorl bears a row of rather sharp serrations on the peripheral keel, which appear especially prickly on all of the spire whorls.

The irregularity in the spiral sculpture has also significantly increased. Three of the basal cords are very swollen, which gives the body whorl an almost subquadrilateral outline. Furthermore, these cords are rendered distinctly prickly by the crossing of the axial ribs. The upper keel is marked by a single, very strong cord.

== Distribution ==
The marine species is endemic to New Zealand.
