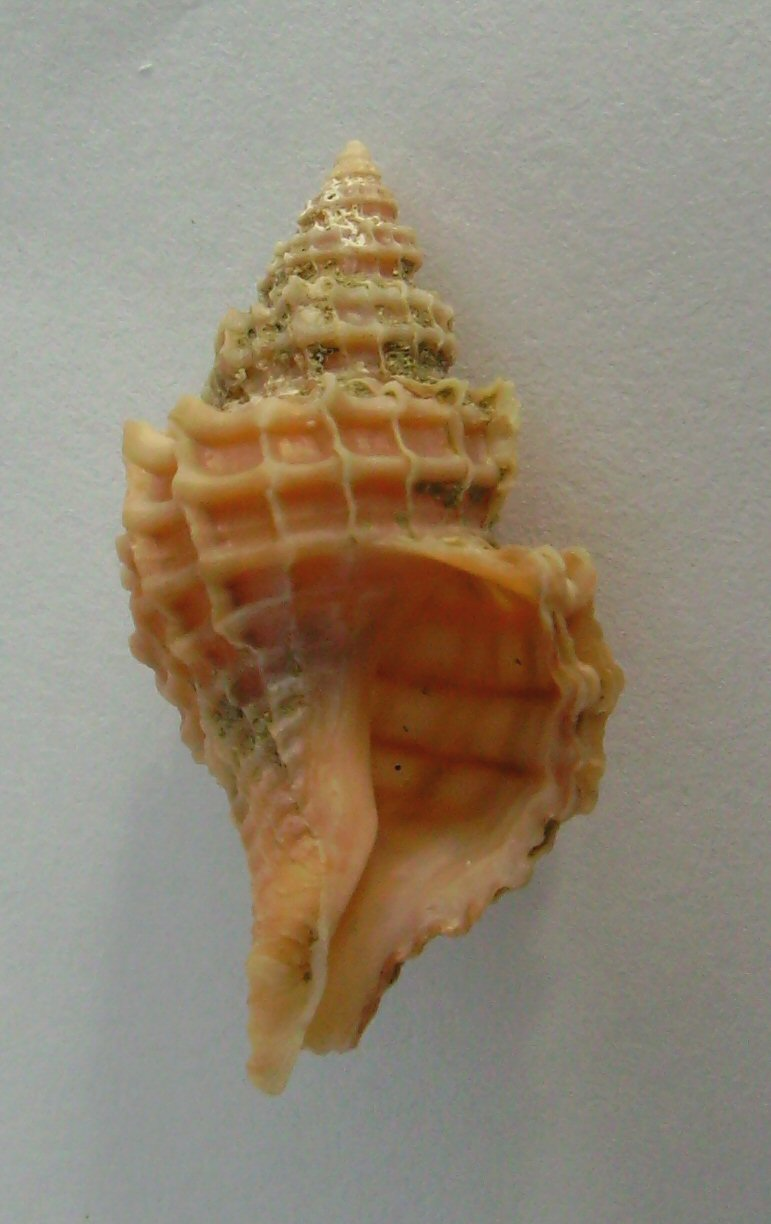
- Apertural view of the shell of Zeatrophon ambiguus (female)

Scientific classification
- Kingdom: Animalia
- Phylum: Mollusca
- Class: Gastropoda
- Subclass: Caenogastropoda
- Order: Neogastropoda
- Family: Muricidae
- Subfamily: Pagodulinae
- Genus: Zeatrophon; Finlay, 1926

= Zeatrophon =

Genus of gastropods

Zeatrophon is a genus of sea snails, marine gastropod mollusks in the family Muricidae, the murex snails or rock snails.

== Species ==
Species within the genus Zeatrophon include:

- Zeatrophon ambiguus (Philippi, 1844)
- † Zeatrophon bonneti (Cossmann, 1903)
- † Zeatrophon lassus (Marwick, 1928)
- Zeatrophon mortenseni (Odhner, 1924)
- Zeatrophon pulcherrimus Finlay, 1930

Species brought into synonymy

- Zeatrophon caudatinus Finlay, 1930: synonym of Xymene mortenseni (Odhner, 1924): synonym of Zeatrophon mortenseni (Odhner, 1924)
- Zeatrophon elegans Fleming, 1943: synonym of Zeatrophon ambiguus (Philippi, 1844)
- Zeatrophon huttonii (R. Murdoch, 1900): synonym of Lamellitrophon huttonii (Murdoch, 1900)
- Zeatrophon murrayae C. A. Fleming, 1943: synonym of † Zeatrophon lassus (Marwick, 1928) †
- † Zeatrophon mutabilis Marwick, 1928: synonym of Zeatrophon ambiguus (Philippi, 1844)
- Zeatrophon tmetus Finlay, 1930: synonym of Lamellitrophon huttonii (Murdoch, 1900)
