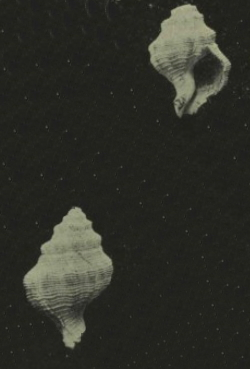
- Shell of Austrofusus apudalpha (holotype)

Scientific classification
- Kingdom: Animalia
- Phylum: Mollusca
- Class: Gastropoda
- Subclass: Caenogastropoda
- Order: Neogastropoda
- Family: Prosiphonidae
- Genus: Austrofusus
- Species: †A. apudalpha

Binomial name
- †Austrofusus apudalpha H. J. Finlay, 1926

Synonyms
- † Austrofusus (Neocola) apudalpha H. J. Finlay, 1926 alternative representation

= Austrofusus apudalpha =

Species of gastropod

Austrofusus apudalpha is an extinct species of medium-sized sea snail or whelk, a marine gastropod mollusc in the family Prosiphonidae.

== Description ==
The dimensions for the type specimen are 16 mm in diameter with an estimated height of 25 mm, while larger specimens reach a height of 32 mm and a diameter of 19 mm.

(Original description) The shell possesses the same general build as the preceding forms, but it is characterized by a somewhat longer siphonal canal, a more compressed body whorl, and a weaker fasciole. The apex is typical of the genus, and the shell consists of six adult whorls that are bluntly keeled at the midline. There are 11 to 12 axial ribs per whorl, which are very similar in development to those of Austrofusus alpha, though they are notably higher and more persistent on the body whorl; these ribs often extend halfway across both the base and the shoulder.

A second keel is indicated a short distance below the first, positioned much closer to it than in the Clifden specimens. Below this second keel, the base contracts rapidly. The spirals are prominent and cord-like, appearing almost equal in size and equidistant across the shoulder and keels. On the base, however, they are a trifle stronger and set wider apart, featuring a single interstitial riblet. In number and arrangement, these spirals are practically identical to those of A. alpha.

The aperture is small but not compressed, and the outer lip is thickened and furnished with many short linear ridges within the interior. The columella is straight and becomes strongly twisted below, forming a fairly long siphonal canal that is bent to the left and only shallowly notched. Although the fasciole is strong, it is not prominently keeled.

== Distribution ==
The marine species is endemic to New Zealand.
