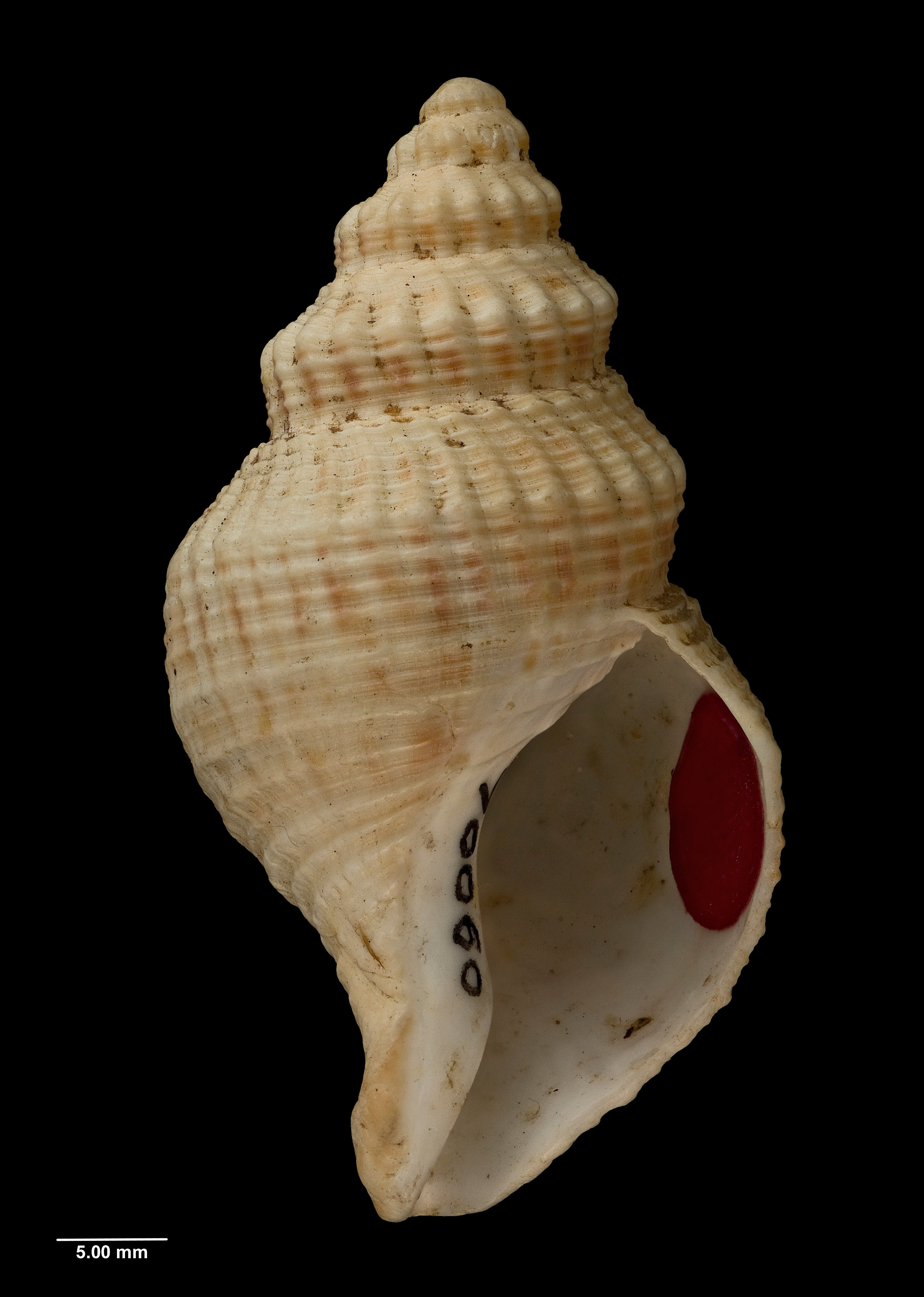
- Shell of Austrofusus chathamensis (holotype at the Auckland War Memorial Museum)

Scientific classification
- Kingdom: Animalia
- Phylum: Mollusca
- Class: Gastropoda
- Subclass: Caenogastropoda
- Order: Neogastropoda
- Family: Prosiphonidae
- Genus: Austrofusus
- Species: A. chathamensis

Binomial name
- Austrofusus chathamensis H. J. Finlay, 1928

Synonyms
- Aethocola chathamensis (H. J. Finlay, 1928); Austrofusus (Austrofusus) chathamensis H. J. Finlay, 1928 alternative representation

= Austrofusus chathamensis =

Species of gastropod

Austrofusus chathamensis is a species of medium-sized sea snail or whelk, a marine gastropod mollusc in the family Prosiphonidae.

== Description ==
The length of the shell attains 54 mm, its diameter 28 mm.

(Original description) This species is distinguished from the typical Austrofusus glans by the obsolescence of the keels, by its more crowded axial ribs, and especially by the persistence of these ribs upon the shoulder. On the penultimate whorl there are 21–25 axial ribs, which run strongly from suture to suture across all the spire-whorls. On the shoulder they become only slightly thinner, are scarcely nodulous at the periphery, and are separated by interstices that measure about one and a half to twice the width of the ribs. On the body whorl the axials become obsolete and are replaced by very numerous ribs of nearly the same strength as the spirals, together forming a coarse yet neat and regular reticulation. The peripheral keel becomes almost obsolete on the body whorl, which is usually somewhat regularly convex, and the lower keel is absent.

In A.glans, by contrast, there are only 16–18 axial ribs on the penultimate whorl. These are merely indicated on the shoulder, but they are strong on the lower half of the whorl and prominently nodular at the periphery and along the lower suture. The interstices are two to four times as wide as the ribs. The axials are rarely obsolete on the body-whorl, and if they do become so, they are not replaced by a coarse reticulation. The keels are very seldom obsolete; both the upper and lower keels—and often a third, still lower one—are usually well defined.

== Distribution ==
The marine species is endemic to New Zealand, occurring at the Chatham Islands.
