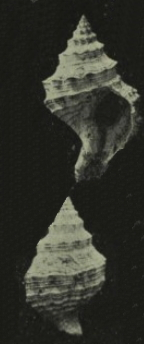
- Shell of † Austrofusus affiliatus (holotype)

Scientific classification
- Kingdom: Animalia
- Phylum: Mollusca
- Class: Gastropoda
- Subclass: Caenogastropoda
- Order: Neogastropoda
- Family: Prosiphonidae
- Genus: Austrofusus
- Species: †A. affiliatus

Binomial name
- †Austrofusus affiliatus H. J. Finlay, 1926

Synonyms
- † Austrofusus (s.str.) affiliatus H.J. Finlay, 1926 alternative representation

= Austrofusus affiliatus =

Species of gastropod

Austrofusus affiliatus is an extinct species of medium-sized sea snail or whelk, a marine gastropod mollusc in the family Prosiphonidae.

== Description ==
The holotype measures 30 mm in height with a diameter of 15.5 mm,

(Original description) This species is closely related to Austrofusus precursor by its sutural cord, two stronger peripheral cords, and strong basal spirals—though the latter are more evenly positioned and graded. However, it differs in possessing a straight shoulder and outwardly, rather than upwardly, pointing nodules. This distinction is due primarily to the extension of the axial ribs, which reach almost to the sutures in this species, whereas in A. precursor, they cease shortly above the keel.

== Distribution ==
The marine species is endemic to New Zealand.
