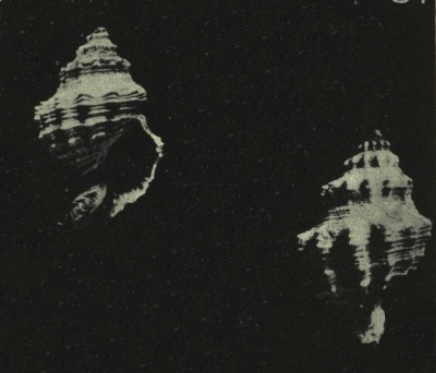
- Shell of Austrofusus ngatuturaensis (holotype)

Scientific classification
- Kingdom: Animalia
- Phylum: Mollusca
- Class: Gastropoda
- Subclass: Caenogastropoda
- Order: Neogastropoda
- Family: Prosiphonidae
- Genus: Austrofusus
- Species: †A. ngatuturaensis

Binomial name
- †Austrofusus ngatuturaensis Bartrum & A. W. B. Powell, 1928

Synonyms
- † Austrofusus (Neocola) ngatuturaensis Bartrum & A. W. B. Powell, 1928 alternative representation

= Austrofusus ngatuturaensis =

Species of gastropod

Austrofusus ngatuturaensis is an extinct species of medium-sized sea snail or whelk, a marine gastropod mollusc in the family Prosiphonidae.

== Description ==
The shell measures 24 mm in height and 14.8 mm in diameter.

(Original description) This species bears a close resemblance to Austrofusus taitae (Marwick, 1924) and also shows a possible alliance to Austrofusus gamma (Finlay, 1926).

The shell is moderately small and fusiform, featuring a conical, stepped spire that stands slightly shorter than the combined height of the aperture and siphonal canal. Based on the paratype, the shell consists of six or seven whorls, beginning with a high, fairly smooth protoconch of approximately three and a half whorls.

The whorls are concave on the shoulder, where the suture is margined by two closely spaced, strong cords on a narrow, raised edge; these whorls appear corrugated as a result of the strong axial costae. While these costae remain faint on the excavated shoulder, they are raised into sharp tubercles at the angle before dying away gradually toward the base. The earliest spire-whorls are convex, whereas the later ones develop an angular keel near the midline. The body whorl further features a faintly nodular lower keel, which provides a more distinctly bi-angular outline than is seen in A. taitae.

The aperture is oval and oblique, featuring a narrow notch at the top due to the appressed shoulder and a distinct angle near the middle. The outer lip is thin and furnished with strong transverse lirae on the interior, while the inner lip is thin and narrowly limited. The columella displays a more pronounced twist to the left and back than is typical for Austrofusus, and the fasciole is marked by very narrow, only slightly raised marginal keels.

The spiral ornamentation consists of strong, sharply raised, and approximately equidistant lirae that surmount the costae and their nodular extensions. The interspaces generally contain one, and sometimes two, subsidiary threads—though even more may appear on the base. At the shoulder angle, two closely spaced lirae and a fairly strong intermediate secondary thread combine to form a distinct keel, while the lower keel of the body whorl is defined by a single strong spiral rib. The central basal area is occupied by three or four strong spiral cords with the usual intervening secondary threads, creating a surface that is inclined to be finely nodular. Below these, the spiral sculpture continues in a similar but less prominent fashion. Finally, oblique growth lines may produce a faint reticulation where they intersect with the spiral lirae.

== Distribution ==
The marine species is endemic to New Zealand.
