= Paraclanculus =

Scientific classification
- Kingdom: Animalia
- Phylum: Mollusca
- Class: Gastropoda
- Subclass: Vetigastropoda
- Order: Trochida
- Superfamily: Trochoidea
- Family: Trochidae
- Genus: Paraclanculus; Finlay, 1926

Genus of gastropods

Paraclanculus is a genus of sea snails, marine gastropod mollusks in the family Trochidae, the top snails.

== Species ==
Species within the genus Paraclaculus include:

The following species were brought into synonymy

- Paraclanculus peccatus Finlay, 1926 : synonym of Clanculus (Paraclanculus) peccatus (Finlay, 1926)
