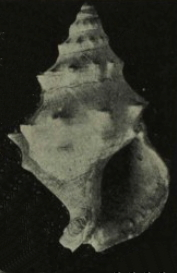
- Shell of † Austrofusus magnificus (holotype)

Scientific classification
- Kingdom: Animalia
- Phylum: Mollusca
- Class: Gastropoda
- Subclass: Caenogastropoda
- Order: Neogastropoda
- Family: Prosiphonidae
- Genus: Austrofusus
- Species: †A. magnificus

Binomial name
- †Austrofusus magnificus H. J. Finlay, 1926

Synonyms
- † Austrofusus (Austrofusus) magnificus H. J. Finlay, 1926 alternative representation; † Austrofusus (Nassicola) magnificus H. J. Finlay, 1926 alternative representation

= Austrofusus magnificus =

Species of gastropod

Austrofusus magnificus is an extinct species of medium-sized sea snail or whelk, a marine gastropod mollusc in the family Prosiphonidae.

== Description ==
The shell measures 55 mm in height and 36 mm in diameter.

(Original description) The shell is large, spinose, and pagodiform in shape. Although the apex and early whorls are much worn, six whorls remain, while it is likely that two to three whorls and the embryo have been lost. Each whorl features a strong, though not particularly high, medial carina that is studded with sharp, high, and thick spines. These spines are prominent on all whorls but are especially well-developed on the last, with counts of 10, 11, and 12 appearing on the body whorl and the two preceding whorls, respectively. The spines themselves are vertically compressed, appearing somewhat truncated in front with a medial ridge behind; they are generally directed slightly backward and are spaced about twice their own thickness apart.

Emerging from the suture is a second keel, which is prominent but sits lower than the upper one. This second keel also bears sharp nodules, though these are much lower and less spiny than the primary ones. They become almost obsolete on the last half of the body whorl, are usually just visible at the suture on the spire whorls, and cause the suture to undulate strongly. On all but the body whorl, the spines are connected by very low, thickish axial ribs that extend neither above nor below them; the interspaces between these ribs are about twice their width and are distinctly sunken.

Dense and fine spirals cover the entire surface, particularly on the shoulder. These spirals are of uneven strength and are finely wavy. On the base, the finer threads become very indistinct, yet some 16 to 18 spirals appear rather wider and more conspicuous; however, all of these are hardly raised above the surface. An intermittent strong cord traverses the center of the spines on both keels. The growth lines are prominent but not raised, appearing dense and fine; they are retrocurrent from the suture and form a deep, narrow sinus upon the spines.

The spire is staged and roughly equal in height to the aperture. The aperture is pyriform and rather ample for the genus. The outer lip is almost regularly curved, not significantly thickened, and is feebly multilirate within. A posterior channel and a slight vertical sinus are present above. The parietal wall is smooth and not excavated. The columella is straight and becomes much twisted far down to form, along with the outer lip, a short, deep, and rather indistinct canal. This siphonal canal is strongly flexed to the left and features a deep, narrow notch that tends both upward and laterally. The fasciole is rather narrow, raised, and prominent, and it is margined by a low but sharp carina.

== Distribution ==
The marine species is endemic to New Zealand.
