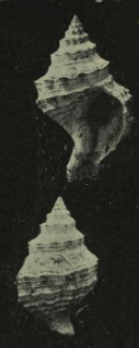
- Shell of † Austrofusus precursor (holotype)

Scientific classification
- Kingdom: Animalia
- Phylum: Mollusca
- Class: Gastropoda
- Subclass: Caenogastropoda
- Order: Neogastropoda
- Family: Prosiphonidae
- Genus: Austrofusus
- Species: †A. precursor

Binomial name
- †Austrofusus precursor H. J. Finlay, 1926

Synonyms
- † Austrofusus (Austrofusus) precursor H. J. Finlay, 1926 alternative representation

= Austrofusus precursor =

Species of gastropod

Austrofusus precursor is an extinct species of medium-sized sea snail or whelk, a marine gastropod mollusc in the family Prosiphonidae.

== Description ==
The holotype measures 35 mm in height and 20 mm in diameter, while the paratype stands 30 mm high with a diameter of 17 mm.

(Original description) This species is so generally similar to Austrofus spiniferus (Finlay) and the Austrofusus glans (Bolten)—and are so evidently the direct ancestors of those species—that they are best described by comparison with them. The apex in all of these forms is typical, and each possesses approximately 14 axial ribs per whorl.

The three Tertiary species differ from the Recent A. glans in that their axial ribs are continuous between the two rows of nodules, which are vertically compressed and somewhat wedge-shaped. In the Recent shell, by contrast, the ribs are almost obsolete, and the nodules are pointed, giving them a more spiny appearance. The fossil shells also feature a longer and more strongly twisted canal, terminating in a shallower notch.

The present species is characterized by very unequal spiral sculpture. A rather strong cord margins the suture, while weak spirals cover the shoulder. A strong cord sits upon the upper keel with another positioned closely above it; these two represent the most conspicuous spirals on the spire whorls. Uneven spirals run between the keels, followed by a group of three strong cords on the lower keel. On the base, there are three massive raised cords with wide interstices that are crossed by fine spiral threads, the center cord being slightly stronger than the others. Alternating strong and weak cords cover the remainder of the base and the canal.

The nodules on the upper keel are directed slightly upward, an effect that is enhanced by the slight concavity of the shoulder. In comparison, A. spinigeferus and A. glans possess much less conspicuous and more uniform spiral ornamentation; they lack a sutural band, stronger peripheral or supra-peripheral cords, and have only weakly developed ribs on the base. In those species, the interstitial ribs are mostly obsolete, and those that remain are only slightly inferior to the main ribs. Furthermore, their nodules are directed more outward, and the shoulder is straighter and more sloping.

== Distribution ==
The marine species is endemic to New Zealand.
