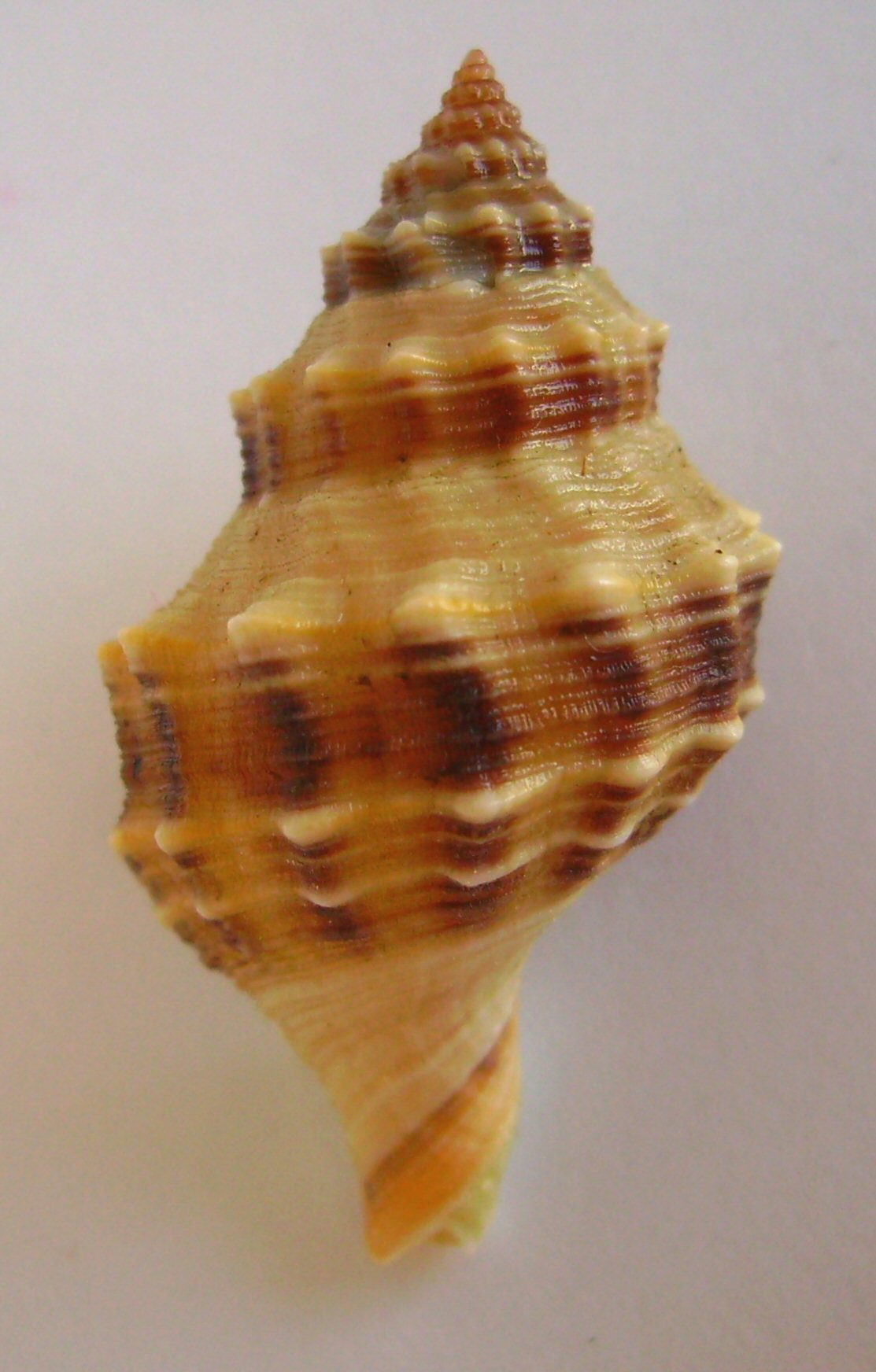
- A dorsal view of a shell of Austrofusus glans

Scientific classification
- Kingdom: Animalia
- Phylum: Mollusca
- Class: Gastropoda
- Subclass: Caenogastropoda
- Order: Neogastropoda
- Family: Prosiphonidae
- Genus: Austrofusus; Kobelt, 1879

Type species
- Fusus nodosus J. E. Gray, 1843

Synonyms
- Aethocola Iredale, 1915 ·; Austrofusus (Austrofusus) Kobelt, 1879 alternative representation; † Austrofusus (Neocola) H. J. Finlay, 1926 alternative representation

= Austrofusus =

Austrofusus Temporal range: Middle Paleocene to Recent, 42.6–0.0 Ma

Genus of gastropods

Austrofusus is a genus of medium-sized sea snails or whelks, marine gastropod molluscs in the family Prosiphonidae, the true whelks.

== Description ==
Two extant species Austrofusus glans and A. chathamensis are endemic to New Zealand waters, but most are extinct and there is an abundant fossil record within the country.

This genus is characterized by the slight development of the fasciole, which is not keeled. The columellar area is excavated at its junction with the parietal wall and becomes considerably twisted further down, though this twist occurs more regularly and less abruptly than in the other groups. This specific excavation renders the columella slightly oblique, ultimately providing the shell with an aperture reminiscent of a Verconella (synonym of Penion P. Fischer, 1884)

Perhaps the most significant and definitive distinguishing feature of Austrofusus is the protoconch. It is consistently conic, polygyrate, and sharply pointed, consisting of three or four smooth whorls. These are followed by a half to three-quarter whorl displaying a brephic sculpture of curved, backwardly sloping axial riblets, which are spaced at twice their own width. In contrast, Cominella J. E. Gray, 1850 possesses a paucispiral, globose, and slightly asymmetrical embryo that exhibits very little distinct brephic sculpture.

== Evolution ==
Austrofusus glans is not closely related to other extant New Zealand buccinid whelks, and is instead related to the Northern Hemisphere genus Colus.

== Species ==
Species within the genus Austrofusus include:

- † Austrofusus acuticostatus (Suter, 1917)
- † Austrofusus affiliatus (Finlay, 1926)
- † Austrofusus allani (King, 1934)
- † Austrofusus alpha (Finlay, 1926)
- † Austrofusus apudalpha (Finlay, 1926)
- † Austrofusus beta (Finlay, 1926)
- † Austrofusus bicarinatus (Suter, 1917)
- Austrofusus chathamensis (Finlay, 1928)
- † Austrofusus claviculus (King, 1933)
- † Austrofusus cliftonensis (Marwick, 1926)
- † Austrofusus coerulecens (Finlay, 1930)
- †Austrofusus conoideus (Zittel, 1865)
- † Austrofusus cottoni (King, 1933)
- † Austrofusus crassiaulatus Darragh, 1997
- † Austrofusus demissus (Marwick, 1931)
- † Austrofusus flexuosus (Marshall, 1918)
- † Austrofusus gamma (Finlay, 1926)
- Austrofusus glans (Röding, 1798)
- † Austrofusus latecostatus (Suter, 1917)
- † Austrofusus magnificus (Finlay, 1926)
- † Austrofusus marshalli (King], 1933)
- † Austrofusus marwicki (King, 1933)
- † Austrofusus ngatuturaensis (Bartrum & Powell, 1928)
- † Austrofusus oneroaensis (Powell & Batrum, 1929)
- † Austrofusus pagoda (Finlay, 1924)
- † Austrofusus pliocenicus (Powell, 1931)
- † Austrofusus precursor (Finlay, 1926)
- †Austrofusus selwyni (Pritchard, 1896)
- †Austrofusus separabilis P. A. Maxwell, 1992
- † Austrofusus soliarius (Dell, 1950)
- † Austrofusus spiniferus (Finlay & McDowall, 1923)
- Austrofusus steinmanni (Möricke, 1896)
- † Austrofusus taitae (Marwick, 1924)
- † Austrofusus valedictus (King, 1935)
- † Austrofusus zitteli (Suter, 1914)

Taxa inquirenda

- † Austrofusus blackei Stilwell & Zinsmeister, 1992
- † Austrofusus casei Stilwell & Zinsmeister, 1992

Species brought into synonymy

- † Austrofusus propenodosa Bartrum, 1919: synonym of † Zelandiella propenodosa (Bartrum, 1919), family Buccinoidea incertae sedis
- Austrofusus alternatus (R. A. Philippi, 1847): synonym of Austrofusus fontainei (A. d'Orbigny, 1841): synonym of Aeneator fontainei (A. d'Orbigny, 1841)
- Austrofusus appresus E. von Martens, 1901: synonym of Fusinus albinus (A. Adams, 1856): synonym of Viridifusus albinus (A. Adams, 1856)
- † Austrofusus cingulifer Marwick, 1931: synonym of † Nassicola cingulifera (Marwick, 1931)
- † Austrofusus contractus H. J. Finlay, 1926: synonym of † Nassicola contracta (Finlay, 1926) (superseded combination)
- Austrofusus fontainei (A. d'Orbigny, 1841): synonym of Aeneator fontainei (A. d'Orbigny, 1841)
- † Austrofusus incertus L. C. King, 1933: synonym of † Nassaria incerta (L. C. King, 1933) (superseded combination)
- † Austrofusus nassa H. J. Finlay, 1926: synonym of † Nassicola nassa (Finlay, 1926) (superseded combination)
- † Austrofusus speighti L. C. King, 1934: synonym of † Austrofusus valedictus L. C. King, 1935 (invalid: not Marwick, 1932)
- † Austrofusus tuberculatus Marwick, 1931 : synonym of † Austrofusus coerulescens (H. J. Finlay, 1930) (junior subjective synonym)
