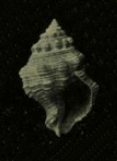
- Shell of † Austrofusus beta (holotype)

Scientific classification
- Kingdom: Animalia
- Phylum: Mollusca
- Class: Gastropoda
- Subclass: Caenogastropoda
- Order: Neogastropoda
- Family: Prosiphonidae
- Genus: Austrofusus
- Species: †A. beta

Binomial name
- †Austrofusus beta H. J. Finlay, 1926

Synonyms
- † Austrofusus (Neocola) beta H. J. Finlay, 1926 alternative representation

= Austrofusus beta =

Species of gastropod

Austrofusus beta is an extinct species of medium-sized sea snail or whelk, a marine gastropod mollusc in the family Prosiphonidae.

== Description ==
The shell stands 30 mm in height with a diameter of 17 mm.

(Original description) Distinguished from Austrofusus alpha by a tendency to stronger tuberculation, giving the peripheral keel a more angular aspect and the whole shell a broader outline; the spirals are less raised and have lost their regularity, three or four on the base becoming stronger and more prominent, and indicating a low second keel, while the three on upper keel are closer but hardly stronger than the others. Spire-whorls often slightly shorter than in previous species, with keel a little below middle.

== Distribution ==
The marine species is endemic to New Zealand.
