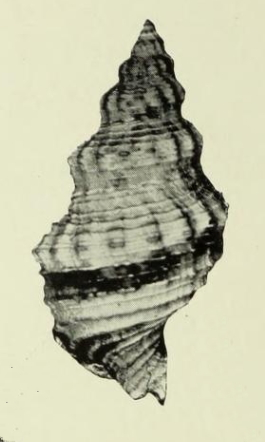
- Shell of Austrofusus pagoda

Scientific classification
- Kingdom: Animalia
- Phylum: Mollusca
- Class: Gastropoda
- Subclass: Caenogastropoda
- Order: Neogastropoda
- Family: Prosiphonidae
- Genus: Austrofusus
- Species: †A. pagoda

Binomial name
- †Austrofusus pagoda (H. J. Finlay, 1924)

Synonyms
- † Aethocola pagoda H. J. Finlay, 1924 (superseded combination); † Austrofusus (Austrofusus) pagoda (H. J. Finlay, 1924) alternative representation; † Siphonalia turrita Suter, 1914 (invalid: not Tenison Woods, 1876)

= Austrofusus pagoda =

Species of gastropod

Austrofusus pagoda is an extinct species of medium-sized sea snail or whelk, a marine gastropod mollusc in the family Prosiphonidae.

== Description ==
The shell measures 55 mm in height and 29 mm in diameter.

(Original description as Siphonalia turrita) The shell is moderately large and fusiform, featuring an elevated scalar spire, numerous nodulous radial ribs, and strong spiral riblets that terminate in a short, open, and recurved siphonal canal.

Sculpture: the protoconch is smooth, while the succeeding whorls bear low, rounded radial ribs. These ribs are produced into sharp nodules upon the carina of the whorls and form smaller nodules where they intersect with the stronger spiral cords, numbering 16 on the body whorl. Toward the base, the ribs vanish, leaving strong incremental striae as the only remaining axial sculpture.

The spiral sculpture consists of two spiral cords positioned close together below the suture, followed by three distant and strong cinguli upon the shoulder, with a fine thread situated in each interstice. A strong spiral cord sits upon the angle of the shoulder, accompanied by two fine threads above it. Below the carina, there are four unequal cinguli, usually separated by a very fine thread. The lowest spiral rib of the penultimate whorl continues over the body and is distinctly nodulous; below this, seven distant, prominent, and slightly moniliform spiral ribs follow, with most of the interstices ornamented by a fine spiral thread.

The spire is turreted and high, standing at approximately the same height as the aperture and siphonal canal combined. The protoconch is small and conic, consisting of two convex whorls. The shell comprises eight whorls that increase rather rapidly in size, with the body whorl being slightly ventricose. The shoulder is broad, steep, and straight, while the whorls are slightly contracted and concave below the angle. The suture is wavy and not particularly impressed.

The aperture is oblique and oval, appearing angled both at the top and on the carina. It contracts below and is produced into a short, oblique, open siphonal canal that is turned to the left, recurved, and notched at the base. The outer lip is sharp, remaining straight above the carina and becoming convex below it as it contracts toward the siphonal canal. The columella is vertical and slightly arcuate, turning to the left below to form the inner margin of the canal. Finally, the inner lip spreads narrowly over the body as a relatively thin callosity.

== Distribution ==
The marine species is endemic to New Zealand.
