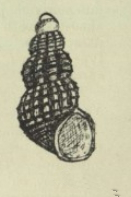
- Shell of Alvania pukeuriensis (holotype)

Scientific classification
- Kingdom: Animalia
- Phylum: Mollusca
- Class: Gastropoda
- Subclass: Caenogastropoda
- Order: Littorinimorpha
- Superfamily: Rissooidea
- Family: Rissoidae
- Genus: Alvania
- Species: †A. pukeuriensis

Binomial name
- †Alvania pukeuriensis (H. J. Finlay, 1924)

Synonyms
- † Alvania (Linemera) pukeuriensis (H. J. Finlay, 1924) alternate representation; † Linemera pukeuriensis Finlay, 1924

= Alvania pukeuriensis =

Species of gastropod

Alvania pukeuriensis is an extinct species of minute sea snail, a marine gastropod mollusc or micromollusk in the family Rissoidae.

== Description ==
The length of this species attains 2.5 mm, its diameter 1.2 mm.

(Original description) The shell is moderately large for the genus, elongated, clathrately sculptured, rather thin, and imperforate.

The protoconch consists of 2 smooth and shining lowly-convex whorls, with a minute nucleus, swelling rapidly, sharply marked off from the sculptured whorls. The whorls of the teleoconch number nearly 4. They are convex, the body whorl regularly and gently rounded. There are four thin spirals per whorl, the interstices many times their width. The spirals are equidistant, but show a wider concave space between the first one and suture above. Another strong spiral emerges on the base from the suture-line, and 4 weaker but similar spirals cross remainder of the base, the lowest often obsolete. The axials begin at same time as the spirals and are narrow, sharp, and distant, the interstices variable but about two to three times their width. The axials number about 18 on the body whorl, very soon dying out below fifth spiral, so that remaining basal spirals are much less crenulated than the others. Points of intersection on higher spirals slightly raised into elongated and rather sharp tubercles.

The spire measures about twice height of the aperture, outlines nearly straight, but the body whorl turns slightly upwards near the aperture which is thus thrown forward basally and axis of shell seems curved. The suture is well impressed. The aperture is ovate, oblique, projecting basally. The peristome is continuous. The outer lip shows a sharp edge but is considerably thickened just previously by a strong varix. The arcuate columella slightly oblique. The inner lip projects prominently as a sharp edge, producing a shallow umbilical chink, surrounded by a very blunt and low basal carina.

== Distribution ==
Fossils of this marine species were found in Tertiary strata in the Lower Waihao Basin, South Canterbury, New Zealand
