= Xymenella =

Scientific classification
- Kingdom: Animalia
- Phylum: Mollusca
- Class: Gastropoda
- Subclass: Caenogastropoda
- Order: Neogastropoda
- Family: Muricidae
- Subfamily: Pagodulinae
- Genus: Xymenella; Finlay, 1926

Genus of gastropods

Xymenella is a genus of sea snails, marine gastropod mollusks in the family Muricidae, the murex snails or rock snails.

== Species ==
Species within the genus Xymenella include:

- Xymenella pusilla (Suter, 1907)
