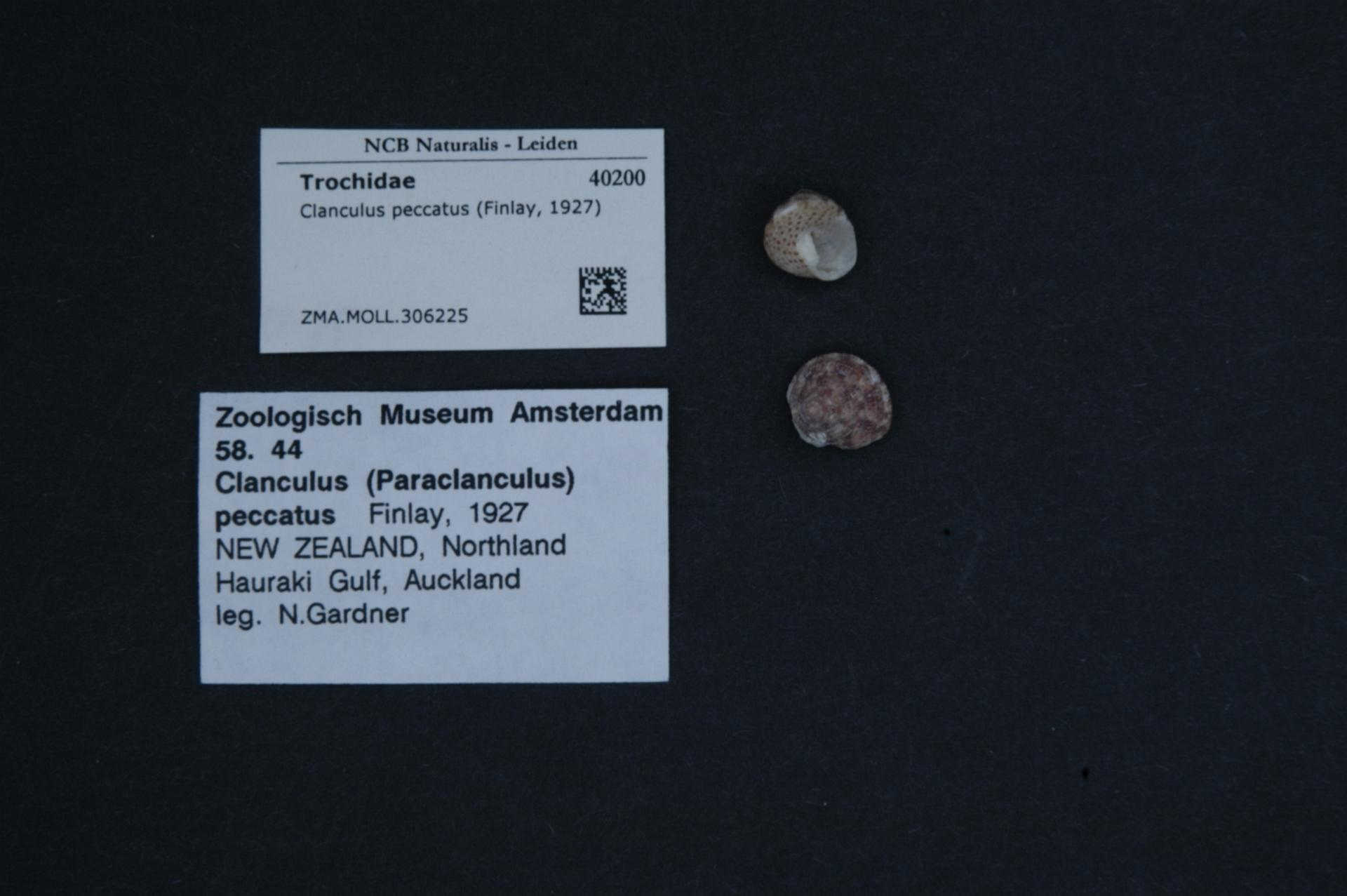
- preserved specimen

Scientific classification
- Kingdom: Animalia
- Phylum: Mollusca
- Class: Gastropoda
- Subclass: Vetigastropoda
- Order: Trochida
- Superfamily: Trochoidea
- Family: Trochidae
- Genus: Clanculus
- Species: C. (P.) peccatus

Binomial name
- Clanculus (Paraclanculus) peccatus (Finlay, 1927)

Synonyms
- Clanculus peccatus (Finlay, 1926) (basionym); Paraclanculus peccatus Finlay, 1927; Trochus ringens Suter, 1913; Trochus takapunaensis Webster, 1906

= Clanculus peccatus =

Species of gastropod

Clanculus (Paraclanculus) peccatus is a species of medium-sized sea snail, a marine gastropod mollusc in the family Trochidae, the top snails.

== Description ==
The height of the shell attains 12 mm, its diameter 12 mm.

== Distribution ==
This marine species is endemic to New Zealand, found under rocks at about 15–20 m off Great Barrier Island.
