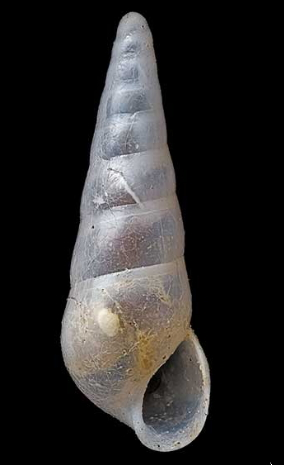
- Shell of Melanella archeyi (holotype at the Auckland Museum)

Scientific classification
- Kingdom: Animalia
- Phylum: Mollusca
- Class: Gastropoda
- Subclass: Caenogastropoda
- Order: Littorinimorpha
- Family: Eulimidae
- Genus: Melanella
- Species: M. archeyi

Binomial name
- Melanella archeyi (Finlay, 1928)

Synonyms
- Eulima archeyi Finlay, 1928

= Melanella archeyi =

Species of gastropod

Melanella archeyi is a species of sea snail, a marine gastropod mollusk in the family Eulimidae. The species is one of many species known to exist within the genus, Melanella.

== Description ==
The length of the shell attains 5.75 mm, its diameter 2.25 mm.

(Original description) The small shell is subulate and perfectly straight. It has a semi‑transparent, polished surface. An outer layer of milky‑white, watery appearance covers the shell, and where this layer is worn off the underlying surface is exposed. A few discontinuous, very inconspicuous varices occur on the right side of the shell. The spire is three to four times the height of the aperture. The embryo is globular and obtuse. There are nine whorls, which increase regularly, are almost flat, bulge slightly near the lower suture, and render the base strongly convex. The suture is submargined by a more opaque band. The aperture is shortly and broadly pyriform and somewhat effuse below. Both the outer and basal lips are rather strongly convex. The columella and inner lip stand vertically, are slightly separated from the base, but do not form an umbilicus.

== Distribution ==
This marine species is endemic to New Zealand and occurs off Stewart Island and Chatham Islands
