= Xymene pumilus =

Scientific classification
- Kingdom: Animalia
- Phylum: Mollusca
- Class: Gastropoda
- Subclass: Caenogastropoda
- Order: Neogastropoda
- Family: Muricidae
- Genus: Xymene
- Species: X. pumilus

Binomial name
- Xymene pumilus (Suter, 1909)

Synonyms
- Axymene pumila Finlay, 1927; Trophon ambiguus pumila Suter, 1909; Trophon bonneti Suter, 1913; Xymene robustus Finlay, 1924

Species of gastropod

Xymene pumilus is a species of predatory sea snail, a marine gastropod mollusc in the family Muricidae, the rock snails or murex snails.
