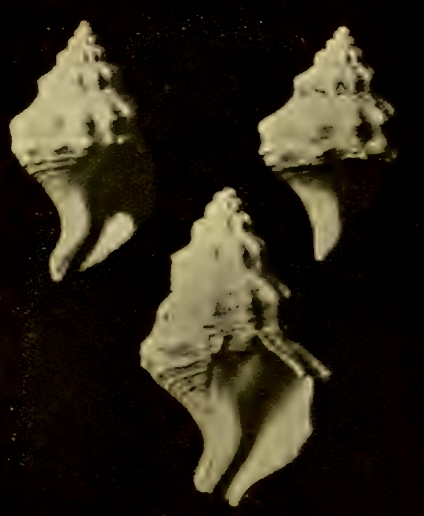
- Shell of Austrofusus spiniferus (holotype below)

Scientific classification
- Kingdom: Animalia
- Phylum: Mollusca
- Class: Gastropoda
- Subclass: Caenogastropoda
- Order: Neogastropoda
- Family: Prosiphonidae
- Genus: Austrofusus
- Species: †A. spiniferus

Binomial name
- †Austrofusus spiniferus (H. J. Finlay & McDowall, 1923)

Synonyms
- † Aethocola spinifera H. J. Finlay & McDowall, 1923 (superseded combination); † Austrofusus (Austrofusus) spiniferus (H. J. Finlay & McDowall, 1923) alternative representation; † Fusinus macrotegens H. J. Finlay & McDowall, 1923 (junior subjective synonym)

= Austrofusus spiniferus =

Species of gastropod

Austrofusus spiniferus is an extinct species of medium-sized sea snail or whelk, a marine gastropod mollusc in the family Prosiphonidae.

== Description ==
The shell measures 43 mm in height and 23 mm in diameter.

== Distribution ==
The marine species is endemic to New Zealand.
