= Alvania interrupta =

Scientific classification
- Kingdom: Animalia
- Phylum: Mollusca
- Class: Gastropoda
- Subclass: Caenogastropoda
- Order: Littorinimorpha
- Superfamily: Rissooidea
- Family: Rissoidae
- Genus: Alvania
- Species: †A. interrupta

Binomial name
- †Alvania interrupta (H. J. Finlay, 1924)

Synonyms
- † Alvania (Linemera) interrupta (H. J. Finlay, 1924) alternate representation; † Linemera interrupta Finlay, 1924; † Rissoa gradata F. W. Hutton, 1885 (invalid: not d'Orbigny, 1842)

Species of gastropod

Alvania interrupta is an extinct species of minute sea snail, a marine gastropod mollusc or micromollusk in the family Rissoidae.

== Description ==
This species is characterized by its irregularly placed spiral ribs—these are crowded anteriorly but almost absent posteriorly, so that the spire whorls have only two distinct ribs close to the suture below. There are, however, traces of faint, flattish ribs with linear interstices between these and the suture above, and a distinct groove crosses the ribs just below the suture.

== Distribution ==
Fossils of this marine species were found in Tertiary strata in New Zealand
