= Austrofusus zitteli =

Scientific classification
- Kingdom: Animalia
- Phylum: Mollusca
- Class: Gastropoda
- Subclass: Caenogastropoda
- Order: Neogastropoda
- Family: Prosiphonidae
- Genus: Austrofusus
- Species: †A. zitteli

Binomial name
- †Austrofusus zitteli (Suter, 1914)

Synonyms
- † Austrofusus (Neocola) zitteli (Suter, 1914) alternative representation; † Siphonalia nodosa zitteli Suter, 1914 superseded rank

Species of gastropod

Austrofusus zitteli is an extinct species of medium-sized sea snail or whelk, a marine gastropod mollusc in the family Prosiphonidae.

== Description ==
The shell measures 25 mm in height and 16 mm in diameter.

(Original description) This species is distinguished from Siphonalia nodosa (synonym of Austrofusus glans (Röding, 1798) ) by its smaller size and much stronger spiral ornamentation.

On the penultimate whorl, two strong spiral cords appear below the suture, followed by a few fine spiral threads. From the angle of the shoulder down to the base of the body whorl, regular spiral riblets are present; these are considerably stronger than those found in Austrofusus glans, and their interstices are broader than the riblets themselves. All of these cinguli are crossed by axial ribs, which are produced into nodules upon the spirals but remain unmarked within the interspaces.

== Distribution ==
The marine species is endemic to New Zealand.
