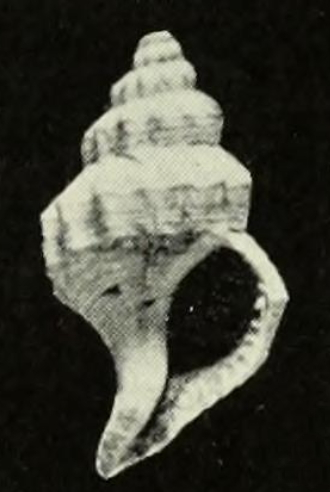
- Shell of Austrofusus acuticostatus (holotype)

Scientific classification
- Kingdom: Animalia
- Phylum: Mollusca
- Class: Gastropoda
- Subclass: Caenogastropoda
- Order: Neogastropoda
- Family: Prosiphonidae
- Genus: Austrofusus
- Species: †A. acuticostatus

Binomial name
- †Austrofusus acuticostatus (Suter, 1917)

Synonyms
- † Austrofusus (Austrofusus) acuticostatus (Suter, 1917) alternative representation; † Siphonalia nodosa acuticostata Suter, 1917 superseded rank

= Austrofusus acuticostatus =

Species of gastropod

Austrofusus acuticostatus is an extinct species of medium-sized sea snail or whelk, a marine gastropod mollusc in the family Prosiphonidae.

== Description ==
The holotype measures 26 mm in height with a diameter of 14 mm,

(Original description) The shell is small and ovate, characterized by distant, sharp axial ribs and spire-whorls that are distinctly keeled. The body whorl is bicarinate and spirally lirate. The sculpture of the protoconch is smooth, while the subsequent whorls feature rather distant, narrowly rounded, and strong axial ribs. There are 12 such ribs on the body whorl; these are directed slightly backward and do not extend over the base, leaving interstices that are broader than the ribs themselves.

The spiral ornamentation consists of regularly arranged fine cords. These are simple on the shoulders of the upper whorls, but below the keel—and also upon the shoulder of the body whorl—a fine spiral thread appears within each interstice, with two such threads situated below the keels. The growth lines are mostly very distinct and serve to reticulate the spiral sculpture.

The spire is conic and turriculate, standing about one-third higher than the aperture (excluding the siphonal canal) with an angle of 53°. The protoconch is small, though its upper portion has been lost. The shell comprises five regularly increasing whorls that are keeled at the middle. On the bicarinate body whorl, the shoulder and the section below the keel are flat, while the base is concave and contracted. The suture is distinct but not deeply impressed.

The aperture is oblique and pyriform, being broadly angled above and produced below into a moderately long, oblique, and open canal. This siphonal canal is bent backward and truncated at its base. The outer lip is biangulate, slightly callous, and distinctly lirate within the interior. The columella is subvertical and straight, though it inflects toward the siphonal canal. The inner lip is narrow and thin, terminating in a point at the bottom. Finally, the siphonal fasciole is adorned with distant transverse lamellae.

== Distribution ==
The marine species is endemic to New Zealand. Specimens were found in Miocene strata.
