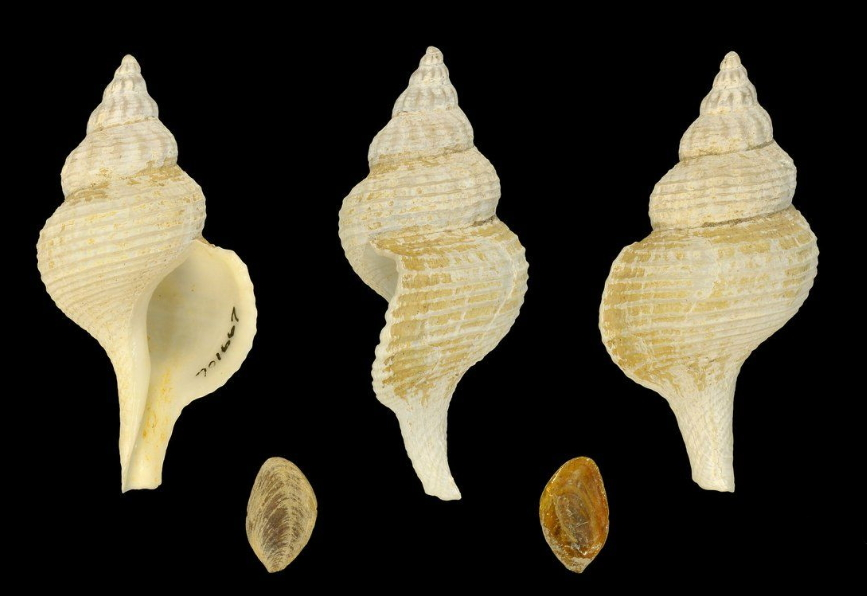
- Shell of Austrofusus steinmanni (holotype at the Smithsonian Institution)

Scientific classification
- Kingdom: Animalia
- Phylum: Mollusca
- Class: Gastropoda
- Subclass: Caenogastropoda
- Order: Neogastropoda
- Family: Prosiphonidae
- Genus: Austrofusus
- Species: A. steinmanni

Binomial name
- Austrofusus steinmanni (Möricke, 1896)

Synonyms
- Aeneator (Ellicea) loisae Rehder, 1971 · junior subjective synonym; Aeneator loisae Rehder, 1971 superseded combination; † Fusus steinmanni Möricke, 1896 superseded combination (original combination)

= Austrofusus steinmanni =

Species of gastropod

Austrofusus steinmanni is a species of medium-sized sea snail or whelk, a marine gastropod mollusc in the family Prosiphonidae.

== Description ==
The length of the shell attains 74.7 mm, its diameter 37.3 mm.

== Distribution ==
The marine species is endemic to Chile.
