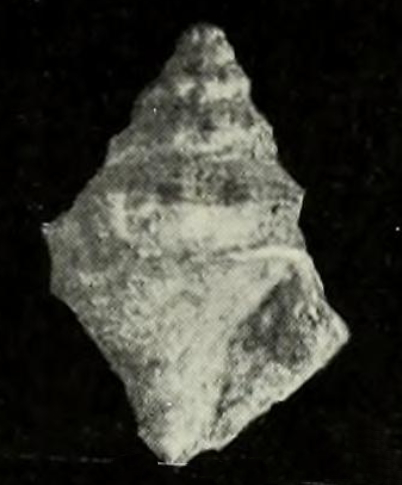
- Shell of Austrofusus bicarinatus (holotype)

Scientific classification
- Kingdom: Animalia
- Phylum: Mollusca
- Class: Gastropoda
- Subclass: Caenogastropoda
- Order: Neogastropoda
- Family: Prosiphonidae
- Genus: Austrofusus
- Species: †A. bicarinatus

Binomial name
- †Austrofusus bicarinatus (Suter, 1917)

Synonyms
- † Austrofusus (Austrofusus) bicarinatus (Suter, 1917) alternative representation; † Fusinus bicarinatus Suter, 1917 (superseded combination)

= Austrofusus bicarinatus =

Species of gastropod

Austrofusus bicarinatus is an extinct species of medium-sized sea snail or whelk, a marine gastropod mollusc in the family Prosiphonidae.

== Description ==
The holotype measures 14 mm in height with a diameter of 9.5 mm,

(Original description) The shell is small and fusiform, featuring a relatively broad, short, and turreted spire. The body whorl is distinctly bicarinate and marked by faint axial ribs that are produced into tubercles upon the keels. While the shell is spirally lirate and likely possessed a long, straight siphonal canal, this feature is unfortunately broken off in all available specimens.

In terms of sculpture, the spire-whorls are keeled at the lower third, while the body whorl displays a second, more feeble carina situated below the first. Except for the smooth protoconch, all of the whorls show numerous low, rounded axial ribs. These ribs are more or less obscure upon the shoulder and do not extend beyond the second keel on the body whorl; however, they form approximately 12 vertically compressed tubercles upon the keels of each whorl. The spiral ornamentation consists of fine, rather distant threads, with seven to eight appearing both above and below the keel on the penultimate whorl. On the base, there are about seven much stronger spiral cords, with the interstices containing a finer spiral thread. Distinct growth lines are also present, which occasionally serve to reticulate the spiral sculpture.

The spire is conical and turreted, standing slightly higher than the aperture (excluding the siphonal canal) with an angle of approximately 55°. Although the initial part of the small protoconch is lost in all specimens, the shell appears to consist of about six whorls. These whorls increase slowly at first, though the body whorl is large in proportion to the rest. The spire-whorls are keeled at the lower third, featuring a flattish shoulder and a slightly receding section below the carina. The body whorl is distinctly biangulate and contracts toward the neck of the siphonal canal.

The suture is simple and not particularly deep. The aperture is small and oblique, angled at the top and produced below into a siphonal canal that was most likely long and straight. The outer lip is angled, remaining straight above and becoming convex below as it rapidly approaches the canal. Finally, the columella is short, rounded, and excavated, bending slightly to the left toward the canal, while the inner lip is relatively thin and narrow.

== Distribution ==
The marine species is endemic to New Zealand. Specimens were found in Miocene strata or older.
