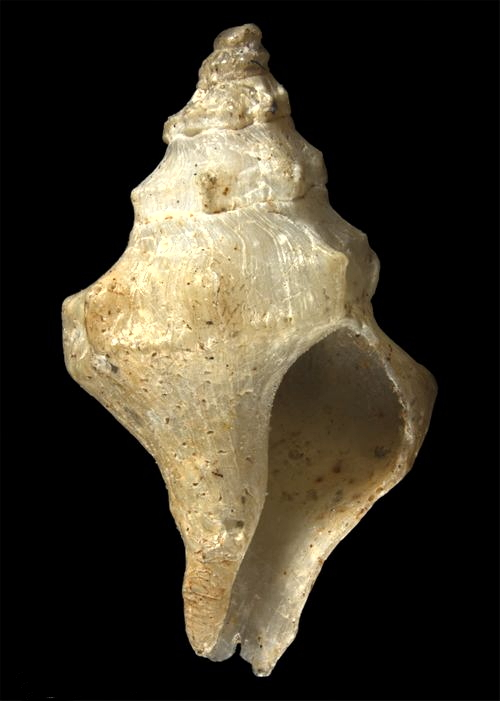
- Shell of Lamellitrophon teres (specimen at the Auckland War Memorial Museum)

Scientific classification
- Kingdom: Animalia
- Phylum: Mollusca
- Class: Gastropoda
- Subclass: Caenogastropoda
- Order: Neogastropoda
- Family: Muricidae
- Subfamily: Pagodulinae
- Genus: Lamellitrophon; B. A. Marshall & Houart, 2022

Type species
- Fusus traversi F. W. Hutton, 1873

= Lamellitrophon =

Genus of gastropods

Lamellitrophon is a genus of sea snails, marine gastropod mollusks in the family Muricidae, the murex snails or rock snails.

== Species ==
Species within the genus Lamellitrophon include:

- Lamellitrophon carinatus B. A. Marshall & Houart, 2022
- Lamellitrophon huttonii (Murdoch, 1900)
- Lamellitrophon tangaroa B. A. Marshall & Houart, 2022
- Lamellitrophon teres (H. J. Finlay, 1930)
- Lamellitrophon traversi (F. W. Hutton, 1873)
