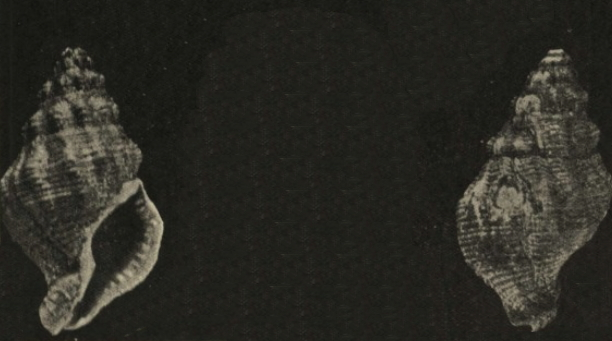
- Shell of Austrofusus oneroaensis (holotype)

Scientific classification
- Kingdom: Animalia
- Phylum: Mollusca
- Class: Gastropoda
- Subclass: Caenogastropoda
- Order: Neogastropoda
- Family: Prosiphonidae
- Genus: Austrofusus
- Species: †A. oneroaensis

Binomial name
- †Austrofusus oneroaensis A. W. B. Powell & Bartrum, 1929

Synonyms
- † Austrofusus (Neocola) oneroaensis A. W. B. Powell & Bartrum, 1929 alternative representation

= Austrofusus oneroaensis =

Species of gastropod

Austrofusus oneroaensis is an extinct species of medium-sized sea snail or whelk, a marine gastropod mollusc in the family Prosiphonidae.

== Description ==
The shell measures 28.5 mm in height (apex missing) and 15.5 mm in diameter.

(Original description) The shell is fusiform and features a distinctive sculpture of axial costae and strong spiral threads. The spire is long, conical, and somewhat gradate; in the holotype, it is approximately equal in height to the aperture and the siphonal canal, though it appears slightly shorter in one of the assumed paratypes. The holotype itself consists of five whorls, though the apex is missing. In the paratype, there are six and a half post-nuclear whorls and a small, conical protoconch of about three whorls.

The spire-whorls are convex in outline and possess a faint median keeled angle, which is rendered weakly nodulous by the presence of fairly strong axial costae. The suture is undulating. The body whorl features a strong upper angle situated below a flat or slightly concave shoulder; below this angle, the outline initially descends steeply in a fairly straight line before bending in a convex curve as it contracts rapidly toward the fasciole. The axial costae are prominent, numbering 11 on the penultimate whorl, and they become fainter below the keel as they pass down toward the suture. These costae eventually die out before reaching the base and also become obsolete on the later portion of the body whorl.

The spiral sculpture covers the entire shell and consists of sharp, approximately equidistant raised cords. These are separated by a variable number of extremely fine interstitial threads, usually ranging from one to three. Some of these cords show a tendency to become stronger as they reach the base. One assumed paratype exhibits a regular alternation of strong and faint spirals on the base and possesses a shorter spire than the holotype.

The aperture is small and pyriform, contracting below into a sophonal canal that is relatively long for this section of the genus. This canal is strongly oblique, decidedly recurved, and features a deep basal notch. A narrow posterior notch is also present, formed by the concavity of the shoulder. The outer lip is slightly sinuous and somewhat expanded; while it is thin at the edge, it thickens rapidly and is strongly lirate within. The lip is concave at the shoulder and then becomes approximately convex below, passing obliquely toward the anterior canal.

The parietal wall is deeply excavated, and the inner lip is narrowly spread as a thin, polished callus through which the spiral cords are faintly visible. This lip becomes minutely rugose over the fasciole. The columella stands erect above and then twists abruptly to the left. The fasciole itself is very prominent and distinct; it is lamellate and shows traces of coarse spiral sculpture on its upper portion. It is bordered against the lower part of the inner lip and canal by a raised ridge that runs up from the left margin of the canal and remains continuous with the outer edge of the labial callus.

== Distribution ==
The marine species is endemic to New Zealand.
