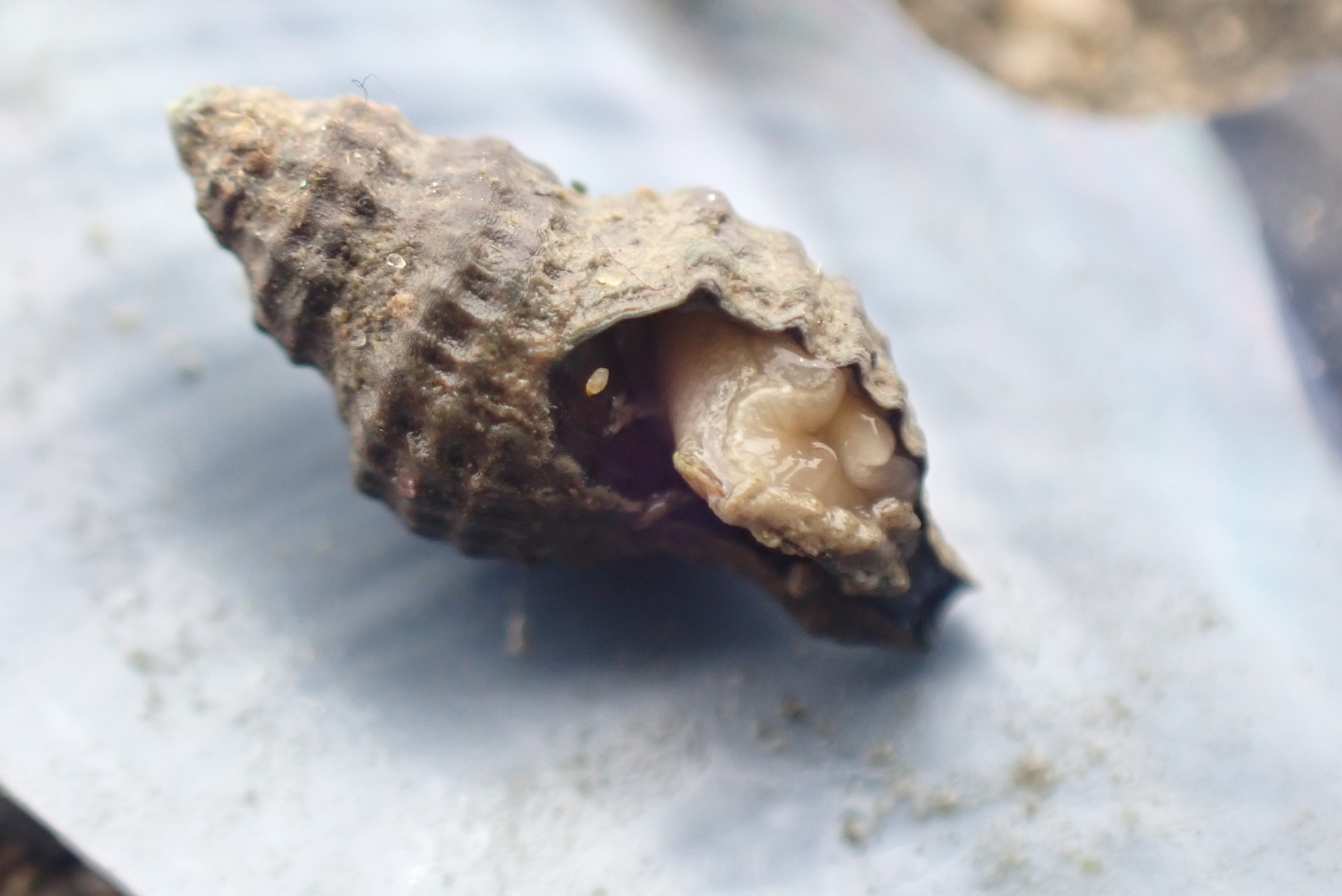

Scientific classification
- Kingdom: Animalia
- Phylum: Mollusca
- Class: Gastropoda
- Subclass: Caenogastropoda
- Order: Neogastropoda
- Family: Muricidae
- Genus: Xymene
- Species: X. plebeius

Binomial name
- Xymene plebeius (Hutton, 1873)

Synonyms
- Fusus inferus Hutton, 1878; Fusus plebeius Hutton, 1873; Xymene inferus (Hutton, 1878)

= Xymene plebeius =

Species of gastropod

Xymene plebeius is a species of sea snail, a marine gastropod mollusk in the family Muricidae, the murex snails or rock snails.

== Distribution ==
This marine species occurs off New Zealand.
