= Xymene teres =

Scientific classification
- Kingdom: Animalia
- Phylum: Mollusca
- Class: Gastropoda
- Subclass: Caenogastropoda
- Order: Neogastropoda
- Family: Muricidae
- Genus: Xymene
- Species: X. teres

Binomial name
- Xymene teres (Finlay, 1930)

Synonyms
- Axymene teres Finlay, 1930

Species of gastropod

Xymene teres is a species of predatory sea snail, a marine gastropod mollusc in the family Muricidae, the rock snails or murex snails.

== Distribution ==
This marine species is endemic to New Zealand.
