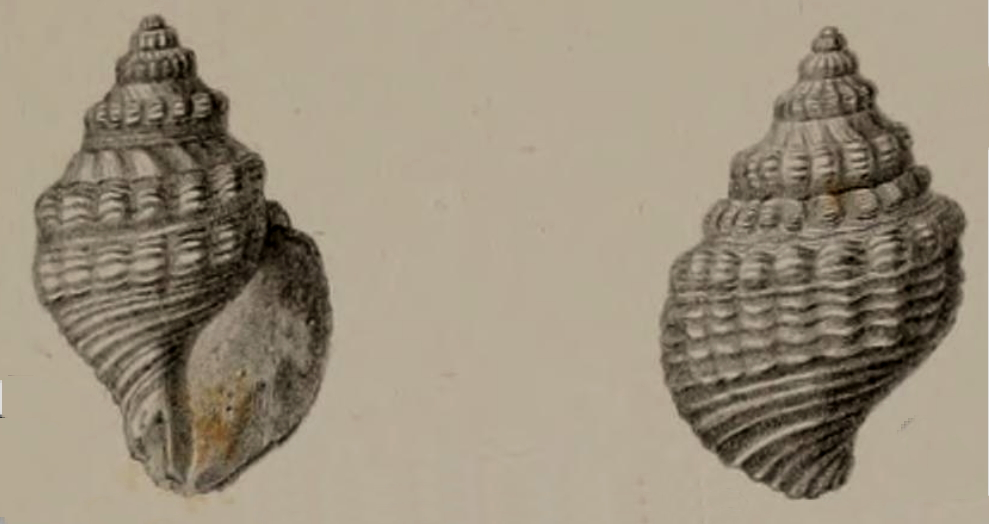
- Shell of Austrofusus conoideus (holotype)

Scientific classification
- Kingdom: Animalia
- Phylum: Mollusca
- Class: Gastropoda
- Subclass: Caenogastropoda
- Order: Neogastropoda
- Family: Prosiphonidae
- Genus: Austrofusus
- Species: †A. conoideus

Binomial name
- †Austrofusus conoideus (Zittel, 1865)

Synonyms
- † Austrofusus (Austrofusus) conoideus (Zittel, 1865) alternative representation; † Purpura conoidea Zittel, 1865 superseded combination

= Austrofusus conoideus =

Species of gastropod

Austrofusus conoideus is an extinct species of medium-sized sea snail or whelk, a marine gastropod mollusc in the family Prosiphonidae.

== Description ==
The holotype measures 35 mm in height with a diameter of 21 mm,

(Original description in German) The shell is oval-conic in shape and features a turreted spire consisting of six to six and a half whorls, which are separated by a simple, slightly impressed suture. The whorls are transversely striated and are furnished at the midline with a distinct, nodulous keel. The final whorl occupies almost exactly two-thirds of the total height; it is ventricose and covered across its surface with numerous narrow transverse ridges that increase in strength toward the base. On this body whorl, the nodulous keel is less sharp than those on the upper whorls, and it aligns with a second, lower-set row of nodules to form regular longitudinal ribs.

Beneath the suture of the body whorl, there is a third row of rounded nodules that remains independent and does not connect with the other two rows. The columella is thick, rounded, and only slightly curved. The oval aperture is compressed at the top, thereby forming a narrow posterior sinus. The outer lip is thin and simple, while the interior of the aperture is marked by fine striations.

== Distribution ==
The marine species is endemic to New Zealand.
