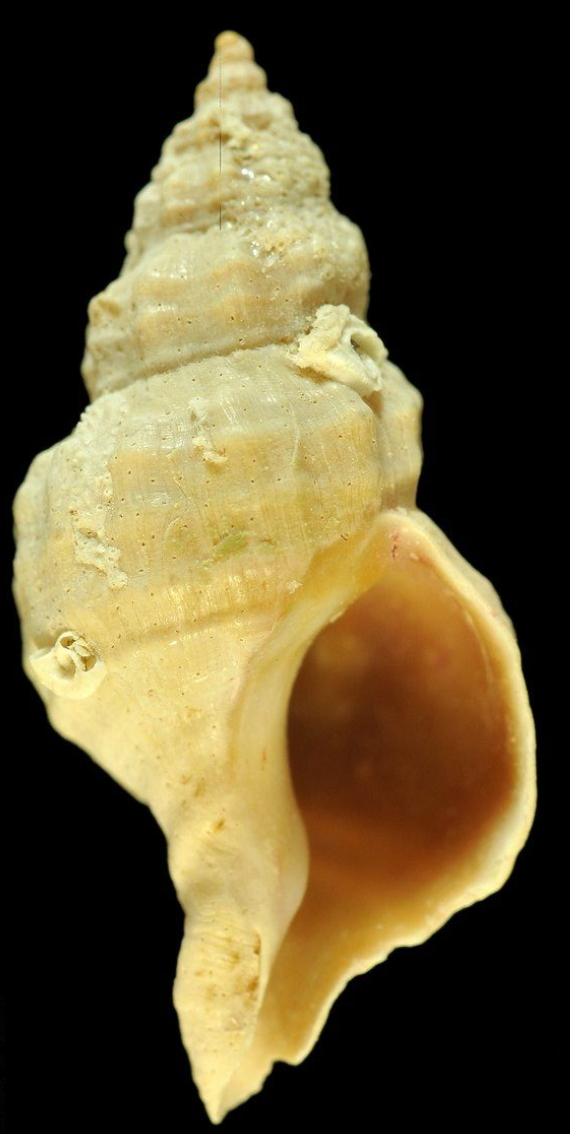
- Shell of Axymene aucklandicus (specimen at the National Museum of Natural History, Smithsonian Institution)

Scientific classification
- Kingdom: Animalia
- Phylum: Mollusca
- Class: Gastropoda
- Subclass: Caenogastropoda
- Order: Neogastropoda
- Family: Muricidae
- Genus: Axymene
- Species: A. aucklandicus

Binomial name
- Axymene aucklandicus (E. A. Smith, 1902)

Synonyms
- Axymene turbator Finlay, 1927; Axymene traversi aucklandica Fleming, 1951; Euthria aucklandica E. A. Smith, 1902; Trophon columnaris Suter, 1908; Trophon erectus Suter, 1909; Trophon (Kalydon) columnaris Suter, 1908; Trophon (Kalydon) erectus Suter, 1909; Xymene aucklandicus (E. A. Smith, 1902)

= Axymene aucklandicus =

Species of gastropod

Axymene aucklandicus is a species of predatory sea snail, a marine gastropod mollusc in the family Muricidae, the rock snails or murex snails.

== Taxonomy and discovery ==
The species was originally described in 1902 by English zoologist Edgar Albert Smith, based on specimens collected from the Auckland Islands. He initially assigned the species to the gastropod genus Euthria, publishing it as Euthria aucklandica in his report on the molluscs gathered during the voyage of the Southern Cross.

The species underwent subsequent taxonomic revision. It was later transferred to the genus Axymene (within the family Muricidae) as Axymene aucklandicus.

== Description ==
The holotype measures 12.5 mm in height and 6 mm in diameter.

(Original description as Axymene turbator) The shell is small and dark in color. The apex is small and papillate, consisting of 1 1/2 smooth whorls, and it features a protoconch that is globose and asymmetric.

There are 14 to 16 axial ribs per whorl; these ribs are faint and thin on the shoulder, but become prominent from that point down to the lower suture. The interstices between them are narrow at the bottom but become subequal to the ribs at their summits, and the ribs themselves rapidly vanish on the base of the shell. On the penultimate whorl, four spiral cords run below the shoulder, which remains smooth, while nine cords are present on the body whorl. These cords are thickish with subequal interstices, and they are undulated and faintly thickened where they meet the axials. The ninth cord, located on the neck of the canal, is very prominent. Faintly lamellose growth lines cover the entire surface of the shell. The spire is subequal in height to the aperture and siphonal canal combined, and its outlines are stepped yet straight. The whorls are strongly shouldered at the upper third, with the shoulder being lightly concave and straight below. The suture is inconspicuous; it is margined below by a pronounced swelling and above by the lowest spiral cord.

The aperture is trapezoidal in shape, widely angled above, and produced below into a moderately long, narrow siphonal canal that is flexed a little to the left and is not notched at the base. The outer lip is thin and sharp; it is vertical in the middle, but runs straight and oblique in opposite directions at the shoulder and the base. The inner lip is defined as a narrow glaze. The columella is subvertical and becomes twisted near the inception of the siphonal canal, from which point it narrows to a long, fine point. The siphonal fasciole is weak and smooth, except for the presence of growth lines.

In coloration, the shell is a sienna-chocolate hue, showing grayish tints on the outside and a deep chocolate color within the aperture, while the columella is lightly touched with white.

== Distribution ==
This marine species is endemic to New Zealand and the holotype was found at Dunedin harbour.
