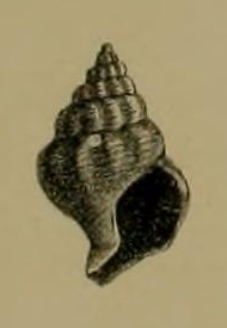
- Shell of Austrofusus selwyni (holotype)

Scientific classification
- Kingdom: Animalia
- Phylum: Mollusca
- Class: Gastropoda
- Subclass: Caenogastropoda
- Order: Neogastropoda
- Family: Prosiphonidae
- Genus: Austrofusus
- Species: †A. selwyni

Binomial name
- †Austrofusus selwyni (Pritchard, 1896)

Synonyms
- † Trophon selwyni Pritchard, 1896

= Austrofusus selwyni =

Species of gastropod

Austrofusus selwyni is an extinct species of medium-sized sea snail or whelk, a marine gastropod mollusc in the family Prosiphonidae.

== Description ==
The shell measures 16 mm in height and 10 mm in diameter.

(Original description) The shell is small and rather thin—at times appearing very thin and fragile—with an elevated, prominent, and acute spire composed of strongly convex and costated whorls. These whorls culminate in a full, ventricose body whorl characterized by a comparatively large aperture and a very short, twisted siphonal canal.

The apical angle measures approximately 50° to 55°. The apex consists of about two smooth, well-defined, and convex embryonic whorls that feature a centrally immersed tip. These embryonic whorls are succeeded by five gradually increasing and markedly convex whorls, which are joined by a well-defined and somewhat impressed suture; occasional specimens appear more constricted at the suture than is typical for the species. The greatest convexity occurs around the middle of each whorl, though there is a tendency toward shouldering at the posterior third. This is a consequence of the slope on the posterior third being somewhat more abrupt and flatter than the more regularly rounded and convex anterior two-thirds. The spire whorls terminate in a broad, ventricose body whorl with a large, oval aperture.

The outer lip is thin and sharp at its outer edge, becoming slightly thicker internally. It bears approximately 20 to 22 close, narrow, and short ridges along its full length, extending from the junction with the anterior canal to the posterior suture. The inner lip is very thin and concavely arched toward the columella, which is itself rather strongly twisted. The siphonal canal is very short and strongly bent to the left; it is finally somewhat reverted and simultaneously raised upward.

The surface is ornamented with transverse costae that are crossed by relatively coarse and fine spiral threads. The earlier half of the first spire whorl is finely and very closely costate, bearing about five or six fine costae. Subsequently, the costae become relatively broader and much more widely spaced. These ordinary costae are narrow, separated by much broader interspaces; they fade out before reaching the posterior suture but are usually developed right up to the anterior suture. They range from about nine to eleven per whorl, though in some specimens, they show a tendency to become obsolete on the body whorl. Both the costae and the interspaces are traversed by lines of growth and fine, close striae that run parallel to them.

The transverse striae are occasionally more noticeable on the posterior whorls, where they are sometimes sufficiently strong to create a fine, cancellated ornament as they are crossed by the spiral threads. This entire system of transverse ornament is intersected by spiral threads, five to seven of which are stouter than the rest. Of these, three or four situated on the anterior slope of each whorl are the stoutest and most prominent at the points where they cross the costae. Between these coarser threads, a finer thread is intercalated, which in turn is flanked by an even finer thread on either side; these delicate details are more easily observed on the body and penultimate whorls than on the earlier spire whorls.

== Distribution ==
The marine species is endemic to Australia and occurs in Tasmania.
