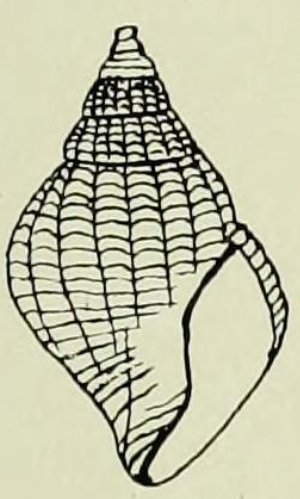
- Shell of Austrofusus latecostatus (holotype)

Scientific classification
- Kingdom: Animalia
- Phylum: Mollusca
- Class: Gastropoda
- Subclass: Caenogastropoda
- Order: Neogastropoda
- Family: Prosiphonidae
- Genus: Austrofusus
- Species: †A. latecostatus

Binomial name
- †Austrofusus latecostatus (Suter, 1917)

Synonyms
- † Alectrion (Tritia) latecostata Suter, 1917 · (superseded combination); † Alectrion latecostatus Suter, 1917 (superseded combination); † Austrofusus (Austrofusus) latecostatus (Suter, 1917) alternative representation; † Nassarius latecostatus (Suter, 1917) (superseded combination)

= Austrofusus latecostatus =

Species of gastropod

Austrofusus latecostatus is an extinct species of medium-sized sea snail or whelk, a marine gastropod mollusc in the family Prosiphonidae.

== Description ==
The holotype measures 8 mm in height with a diameter of 4.5 mm,

(Original description) The shell is small, ovate, and imperforate, possessing a ventricose and rather fragile structure. It is characterized by broad, flattish axial ribs, numerous spiral cords, a very slightly callous inner lip, and a short, deflected anterior siphonal canal.

The two minute whorls of the protoconch are smooth, while the third whorl displays two to three fine spiral threads. The succeeding whorls are broadly and axially costate; these ribs are flatly convex—numbering approximately 13 on the body whorl—and are separated by linear interstices. They are crossed by equal, convex spiral cords, with six to seven appearing on the penultimate whorl, separated by narrow, linear interspaces. Additionally, the base of the inner lip features three oblique cords situated upon the neck of the siphonal canal.

The spire is conic and stands at approximately the same height as the aperture (excluding the siphonal canal). The protoconch itself is minute and conical, consisting of two slightly convex whorls and a blunt pullus. The shell comprises six convex whorls, with the body whorl being ventricose and large in proportion to the rest; the base of this whorl contracts toward the siphonal canal. The suture is well impressed, adding definition to the shell's profile.

The aperture is subvertical and narrowly ovate, leading into a short siphonal canal below that is turned to the left and truncated at its base. The outer lip is convex and smooth on the inside. Finally, the columella is short, vertical, and rounded, while the inner lip is smooth and broadly expanded as a thin callus over a portion of the body whorl.

== Distribution ==
The marine species is endemic to New Zealand. Specimens were found in Miocene strata.
