= Zeatrophon pulcherrimus =

Scientific classification
- Kingdom: Animalia
- Phylum: Mollusca
- Class: Gastropoda
- Subclass: Caenogastropoda
- Order: Neogastropoda
- Family: Muricidae
- Genus: Zeatrophon
- Species: Z. pulcherrimus

Binomial name
- Zeatrophon pulcherrimus Finlay, 1930

Synonyms
- Xymene pulcherrimus Finlay, 1930

Species of gastropod

Zeatrophon pulcherrimus is a species of small predatory sea snail, a marine gastropod mollusc in the family Muricidae, the rock snails or murex snails.
