= Xymene erectus =

Scientific classification
- Kingdom: Animalia
- Phylum: Mollusca
- Class: Gastropoda
- Subclass: Caenogastropoda
- Order: Neogastropoda
- Family: Muricidae
- Genus: Xymene
- Species: X. erectus

Binomial name
- Xymene erectus (Suter, 1909)

Synonyms
- Fusus duodecimus Gray, 1843; Trophon columnaris Suter, 1908; Trophon erectus Suter, 1909

Species of gastropod

Xymene erectus is a species of sea snail, a marine gastropod mollusk in the family Muricidae, the murex snails or rock snails.
