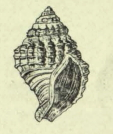
- Shell of Austrofusus cliftonensis (holotype)

Scientific classification
- Kingdom: Animalia
- Phylum: Mollusca
- Class: Gastropoda
- Subclass: Caenogastropoda
- Order: Neogastropoda
- Family: Prosiphonidae
- Genus: Austrofusus
- Species: †A. cliftonensis

Binomial name
- †Austrofusus cliftonensis (Marwick, 1926)

Synonyms
- † Aethocola cliftonensis Marwick, 1926 unaccepted; † Austrofusus (Neocola) cliftonensis (Marwick, 1926) alternative representation

= Austrofusus cliftonensis =

Species of gastropod

Austrofusus cliftonensis is an extinct species of medium-sized sea snail or whelk, a marine gastropod mollusc in the family Prosiphonidae.

== Description ==
The holotype measures 22 mm in height with a diameter of 15 mm,

(Original description) The shell is rather small and possesses a broadly fusiform shape. The spire is gradate and stands at approximately two-thirds the height of the aperture and the siphonal canal.

It consists of five whorls, which are strongly shouldered and rise distinctly onto the preceding whorl. The body whorl contracts rapidly toward a short, strongly twisted neck that features a well-marked fasciole, bounded above by a projecting ridge. The suture is undulating and impressed, being deeply bordered on its lower margin.

Sculpture: the shell shows 15 to 17 strong axial ribs; these become weaker upon the shoulder and die out as they reach the base of the body whorl. These ribs are crossed by strong spirals separated by wide interspaces. The concave shoulder bears five to seven closely set spiral threads, while the spire whorls feature about four strong threads below these. The body whorl is further marked by approximately 11 strong spirals.

The aperture is ovate and channeled at the top, while the bottom is produced into a short, wide, and strongly twisted siphonal canal that is deeply notched at the base. The outer lip is thin and straight, and the inner lip is only lightly calloused. Finally, the columella is straight and smooth.

== Distribution ==
The marine species is endemic to New Zealand.
