= Xymene warreni =

Scientific classification
- Kingdom: Animalia
- Phylum: Mollusca
- Class: Gastropoda
- Subclass: Caenogastropoda
- Order: Neogastropoda
- Family: Muricidae
- Genus: Xymene
- Species: X. warreni

Binomial name
- Xymene warreni Ponder, 1972

Species of gastropod

Xymene warreni is a species of predatory sea snail, a marine gastropod mollusc in the family Muricidae, the rock snails or murex snails, and was first described in 1972 by Winston Ponder.

== Distribution ==
This marine species is endemic to New Zealand.
