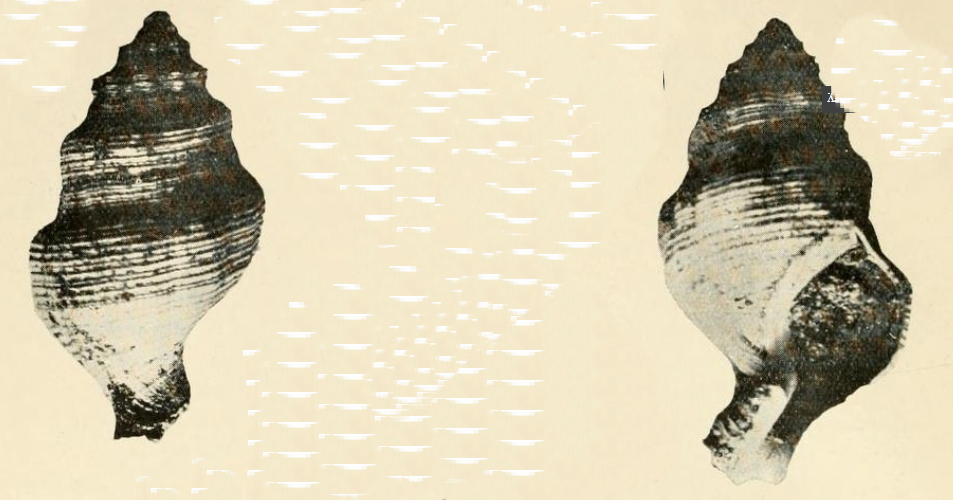
- Shell of Austrofusus flexuosus (holotype)

Scientific classification
- Kingdom: Animalia
- Phylum: Mollusca
- Class: Gastropoda
- Subclass: Caenogastropoda
- Order: Neogastropoda
- Family: Prosiphonidae
- Genus: Austrofusus
- Species: †A. flexuosus

Binomial name
- †Austrofusus flexuosus (P. Marshall, 1918)

Synonyms
- † Austrofusus (Neocola) flexuosus (P. Marshall, 1918) alternative representation; † Siphonalia flexuosa P. Marshall, 1918 (superseded combination)

= Austrofusus flexuosus =

Species of gastropod

Austrofusus flexuosus is an extinct species of medium-sized sea snail or whelk, a marine gastropod mollusc in the family Prosiphonidae.

== Description ==
The holotype measures 28 mm in height with a diameter of 17 mm.

(Original description) The shell is of moderate size and has an oval shape. The spire consists of six whorls that decrease rapidly in size. The aperture occupies rather less than half the total length of the shell. The outer lip is moderately thick and is ornamented internally with several short spiral lines. The siphonal canal is of moderate length and is bent sharply to the right.

The sculpture of the shell shows ten radial ribs on each whorl; these extend to the anterior suture but barely reach the posterior one, and they are more distinct on the upper whorls. The suture is strongly margined on its anterior side. The posterior portion of each whorl is concave in outline.

All parts of the whorls are covered with large, rounded spiral ribs, and there is usually a small thread between each pair of ribs. On the beak, the larger spiral threads are less pronounced, while the interstitial threads become more numerous. Growth lines are abundant and particularly conspicuous on the body whorl.

== Distribution ==
The marine species is endemic to New Zealand.
