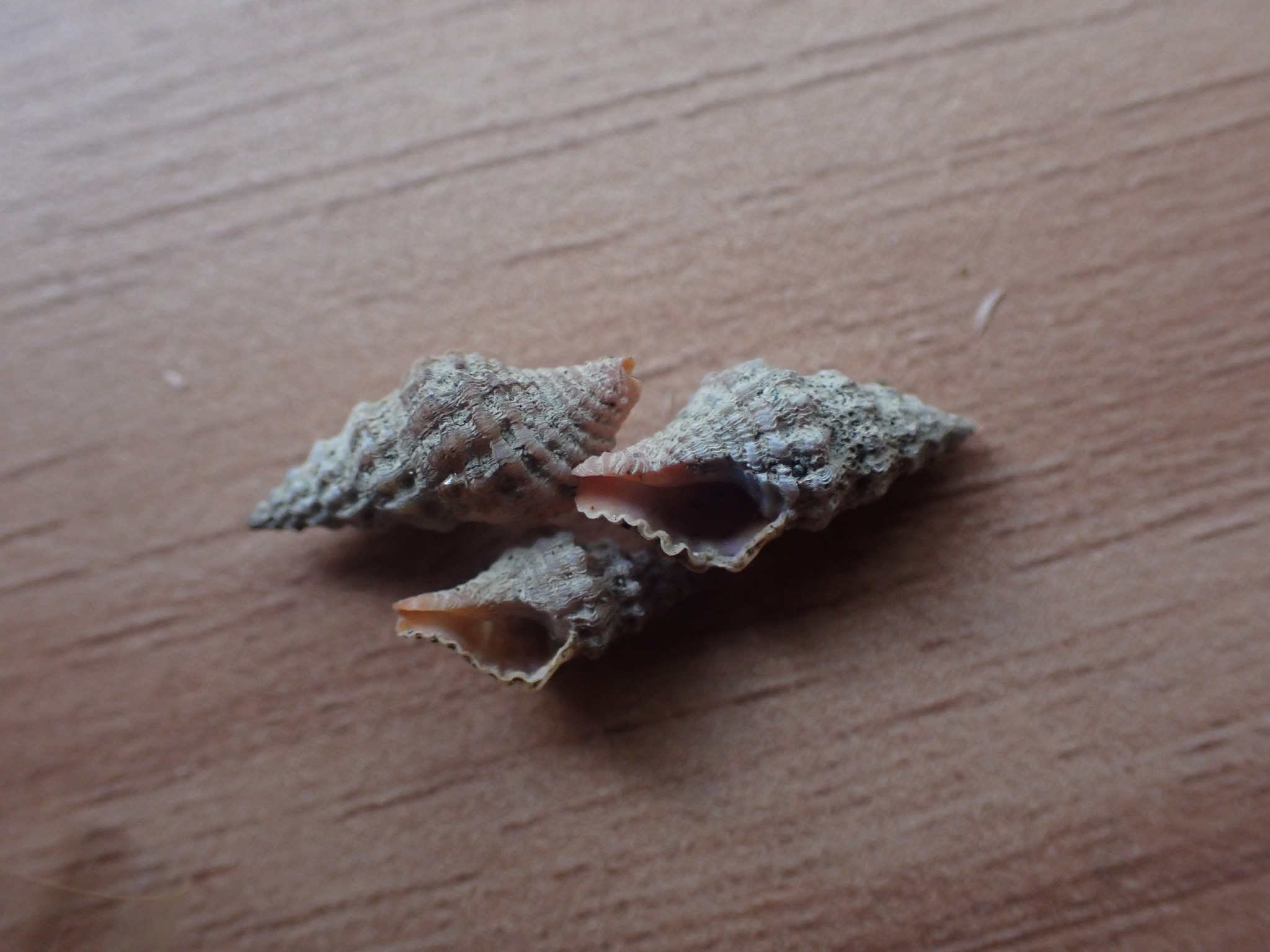
- Lamellitrophon in Paremata, New Zealand

Scientific classification
- Kingdom: Animalia
- Phylum: Mollusca
- Class: Gastropoda
- Subclass: Caenogastropoda
- Order: Neogastropoda
- Family: Muricidae
- Genus: Lamellitrophon
- Species: L. huttoni

Binomial name
- Lamellitrophon huttoni (Murdoch, 1900)

Synonyms
- Trophon huttonii Murdoch, 1900; Trophon (Kalydon) huttonii Murdoch, 1900 (original combination); Xymene huttonii Ponder, 1972; Zeatrophon huttonii (Murdoch, 1900) (superseded combination); Zeatrophon tmetus Finlay, 1930

= Lamellitrophon huttonii =

Species of gastropod

Lamellitrophon huttoni is a species of predatory sea snail, a marine gastropod mollusc in the family Muricidae, the rock snails or murex snails.

== Distribution ==
This marine species is endemic to New Zealand.
