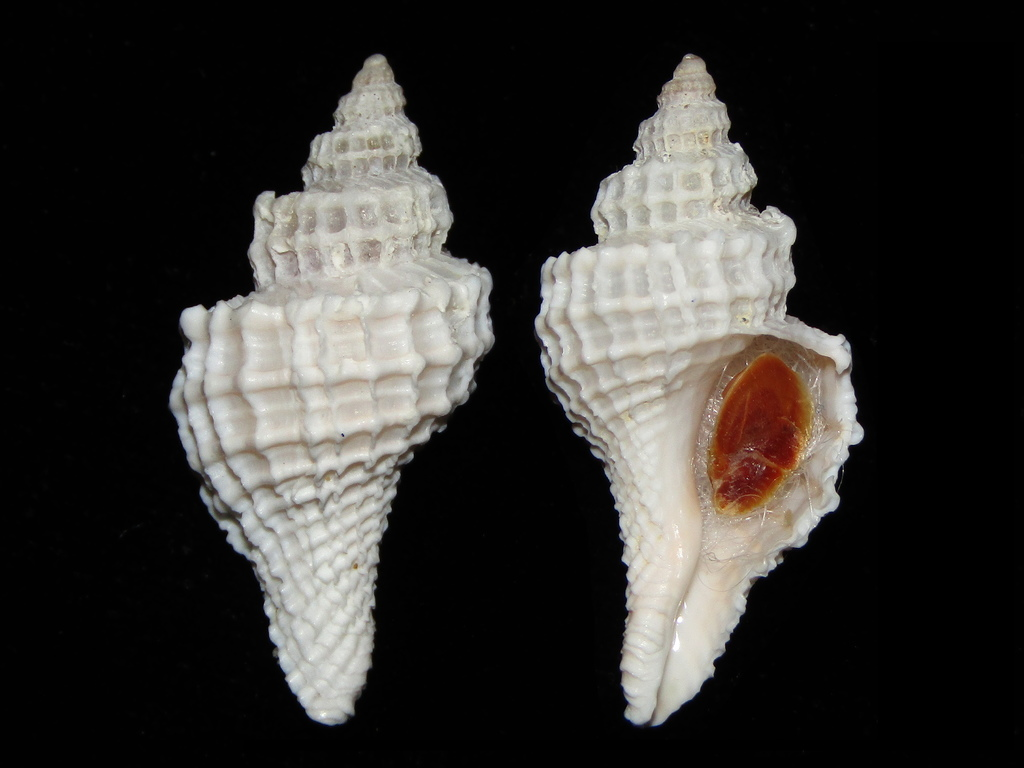
- A shell of Zeatrophon ambiguus from New Zealand

Scientific classification
- Kingdom: Animalia
- Phylum: Mollusca
- Class: Gastropoda
- Subclass: Caenogastropoda
- Order: Neogastropoda
- Family: Muricidae
- Genus: Zeatrophon
- Species: Z. ambiguus

Binomial name
- Zeatrophon ambiguus (Philippi, 1844)

Synonyms
- Fusus ambiguus Philippi, 1844 (original combination); Fusus cretaceus Reeve, 1847; Trophon ambiguus (R. A. Philippi, 1844) superseded combination; Trophon spiratus H. Adams & A. Adams, 1863; Xymene ambiguus (Philippi, 1844); Zeatrophon elegans Fleming, 1943; Zeatrophon mutabilis Marwick, 1928

= Zeatrophon ambiguus =

Species of gastropod

Zeatrophon ambiguus common name the large trophon, is a species of large predatory sea snail, a marine gastropod mollusc in the family Muricidae, the rock snails or murex snails.

== Description ==
The length of the ashell attains 56 mm, its diameter, 31 mm.

(Described as Trophon ambiguus) The fusiform shell is not very thick, usually with an umbilical chink, turriculate, reticulated by spiral and axial ribs.

The sculpture consists of two spiral ridges on the spire-whorls, the upper of which is on the carina of the whorls. The interstices show an occasional finer ridge. The body whorl has numerous unequal spirals, some of which are usually more prominent than the others. There is a distinct fasciole along the siphonal canal. The axial sculpture is formed by subequal sharp varices on the spire-whorls, very inequidistant and often almost obsolete on the body whorl. The points of intersection, especially on the carina of the whorls, are nodulous, or produced into short hollow spines.

The colour of the shell is white or yellowish. Inside it is white, greenish, or light brown.

The spire is conical, shorter than the aperture with the siphonal canal. The protoconch consists of 2J convex and smooth whorls, the nucleus is minute and rounded. Whorls 1 to 8 with a broad, flat, and but slightly sloping shoulder, lightly convex below it. The base is contracted towards the siphonal canal. The suture is not much impressed. The aperture is ovate, broadly angled above, produced below into a moderately long and open siphonal canal, which is recurved and bent to the left. The outer lip is usually thin and sharp, but in old specimens it is often much thickened inside. It is generally finely crenulated, but sometimes almost smooth. It is distinctly angled above, contracted on approaching the siphonal canal. The columella is vertical, somewhat excavated. Inner lip thin, extending a short distance beyond the columella, and has a well-defined margin. It forms a more or less thick callous layer on the concave parietal wall, and is narrowed below to a fine and sharp ridge. The fasciole is well defined and lamellar. The umbilical chink is mostly distinct. The operculum has the nucleus subapical.

Dentition: The central tooth is transverse, with 5 cusps, of which the median and externals are much larger, but all 5 are united at the base. The laterals are angled and unicuspid.

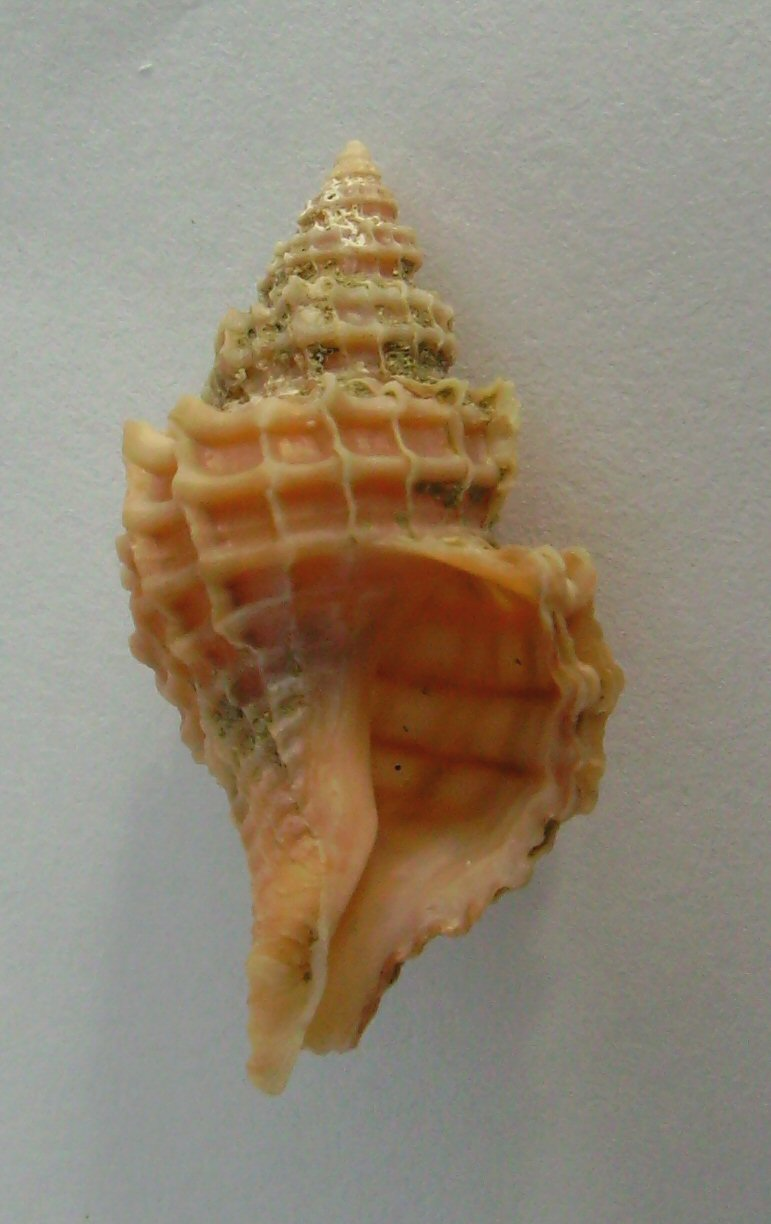
Apertural view of the shell of Zeatrophon ambiguus (female)

== Distribution ==
This marine species is endemic to New Zealand.
