= Xymenella pusilla =

Scientific classification
- Kingdom: Animalia
- Phylum: Mollusca
- Class: Gastropoda
- Subclass: Caenogastropoda
- Order: Neogastropoda
- Family: Muricidae
- Genus: Xymenella
- Species: X. pusilla

Binomial name
- Xymenella pusilla (Suter, 1907)

Synonyms
- Cymatium suteri Marshall & Murdoch, 1921; Trophon pusillus Suter, 1907 (original combination); Xymene oliveri Marwick, 1924; Xymene pusillus (Suter, 1907)

Species of gastropod

Xymenella pusilla is a species of sea snail, a marine gastropod mollusk in the family Muricidae, the murex snails or rock snails.

== Distribution ==
This marine species is endemic to New Zealand.
