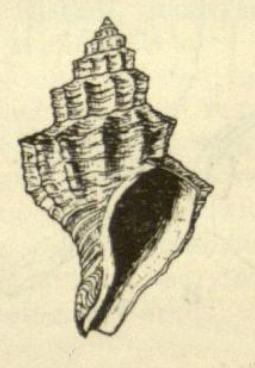
- Shell of Austrofusus taitae

Scientific classification
- Kingdom: Animalia
- Phylum: Mollusca
- Class: Gastropoda
- Subclass: Caenogastropoda
- Order: Neogastropoda
- Family: Prosiphonidae
- Genus: Austrofusus
- Species: †A. taitae

Binomial name
- †Austrofusus taitae (Marwick, 1924)

Synonyms
- † Aethocola taitae Marwick, 1924; † Austrofusus (Austrofusus) taitae (Marwick, 1924) alternative representation

= Austrofusus taitae =

Species of gastropod

Austrofusus taitae is an extinct species of medium-sized sea snail or whelk, a marine gastropod mollusc in the family Prosiphonidae.

== Description ==
The shell measures 34 mm in height and 18.5 mm in diameter.

== Distribution ==
The marine species is endemic to New Zealand.
