= Zeatrophon mortenseni =

Scientific classification
- Kingdom: Animalia
- Phylum: Mollusca
- Class: Gastropoda
- Subclass: Caenogastropoda
- Order: Neogastropoda
- Family: Muricidae
- Genus: Zeatrophon
- Species: Z. mortenseni

Binomial name
- Zeatrophon mortenseni (Odhner, 1924)

Synonyms
- Trophon mortenseni Odhner, 1924; Xymene mortenseni (Odhner, 1924); Xymene mortenseni caudatinus (Finlay, 1930); Xymene mortenseni mortenseni (Odhner, 1924); Zeatrophon caudatinus Finlay, 1930 (original combination); Zeatrophon mortenseni caudatinus (Finlay, 1930); Zeatrophon mortenseni mortenseni (Odhner, 1924)

Species of gastropod

Zeatrophon mortenseni is a species of predatory sea snail, a marine gastropod mollusc in the family Muricidae, the rock snails or murex snails.

== Distribution ==
This marine species is endemic to New Zealand.
