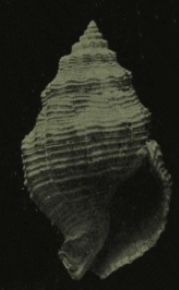
- Shell of † Austrofusus alpha (holotype)

Scientific classification
- Kingdom: Animalia
- Phylum: Mollusca
- Class: Gastropoda
- Subclass: Caenogastropoda
- Order: Neogastropoda
- Family: Prosiphonidae
- Genus: Austrofusus
- Species: †A. alpha

Binomial name
- †Austrofusus alpha H. J. Finlay, 1926

Synonyms
- † Austrofusus (Neocola) alpha H. J. Finlay, 1926 alternative representation

= Austrofusus alpha =

Species of gastropod

Austrofusus alpha is an extinct species of medium-sized sea snail or whelk, a marine gastropod mollusc in the family Prosiphonidae.

== Description ==
The shell stands 27 mm in height with a diameter of 15 mm.

(Original description) The shell is of moderate size and possesses a classic bucciniform shape with a fairly solid structure. The embryo is conic and polygyrate, terminating in a sharply pointed apex. It consists of three to four smooth whorls, followed by a three-quarter whorl that displays a brephic (early stage of development) sculpture of curved, backwardly-sloping axial riblets spaced at twice their own width.

The adult portion of the shell comprises six whorls, each marked by a medial keel. While this keel is never particularly sharp, it appears weaker on the first and penultimate whorls and tends toward obsolescence on the body whorl; notably, the base shows no indication of a second keel. There are 11 to 13 axial ribs per whorl, which remain continuous between the sutures on the first three whorls. From that point forward, the ribs become obsolete on the shoulder and nearly vanish on the body whorl and base, persisting only as blunt swellings upon the keel. These ribs are positioned slightly more than their own width apart.

The spirals appear as raised cords of regular strength across the entire surface and do not increase in prominence on the base, though they occasionally alternate in size. There are 11 such cords on the penultimate whorl—six of which sit upon the shoulder—and approximately 26 on the body whorl and base, with the three cords located on the keel being slightly stronger than the rest.

The base contracts rapidly into a short, strongly twisted prolongation that contains a very prominent fasciole, which is bordered by a high, sharp carination. The aperture is narrow and tapers quickly into a short, deep siphonal canal that is notched backward but hardly upward. The outer lip is grooved at the spirals and features short linear ribs further within the interior. The columella is stout, becoming strongly twisted and attenuated toward the bottom, while the parietal and inner-lip callus is well-defined without being overly thick.

== Distribution ==
The marine species is endemic to New Zealand.
