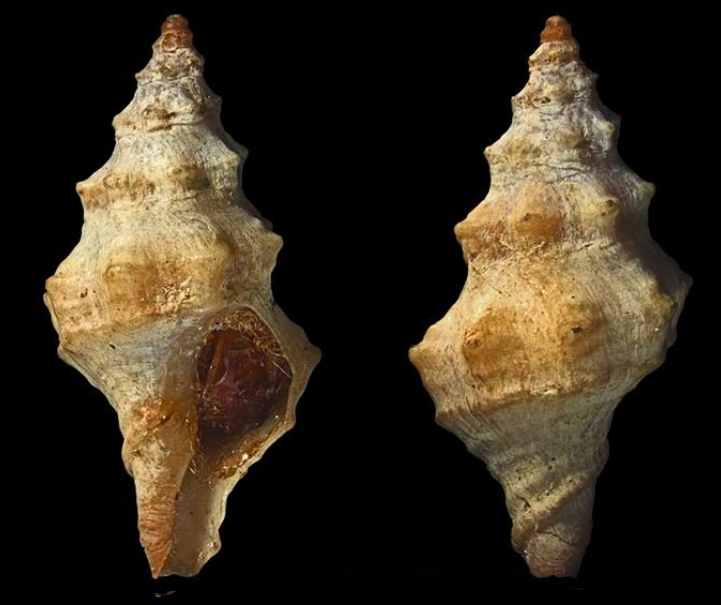
- Shell of Lamellitrophon traversi

Scientific classification
- Kingdom: Animalia
- Phylum: Mollusca
- Class: Gastropoda
- Subclass: Caenogastropoda
- Order: Neogastropoda
- Family: Muricidae
- Genus: Lamellitrophon
- Species: L. traversi

Binomial name
- Lamellitrophon traversi (Hutton, 1873)

Synonyms
- Axymene traversi (F. W. Hutton, 1873) superseded combination; Euthria linea traversi Suter, 1913; Fusus corticatus Hutton, 1873; Fusus traversi Hutton, 1873 (original combination); Trophon waipipicola Webster, 1906; Xymene quirindus Iredale, 1915; Xymene traversi (Hutton, 1873)

= Lamellitrophon traversi =

Species of gastropod

Lamellitrophon traversi is a species of predatory sea snail, a marine gastropod mollusc in the family Muricidae, the rock snails or murex snails.

== Description ==
(Original description) The shell is ovate-fusiform. The spire whorls and the posterior portion of the body whorl are longitudinally ribbed, with ten ribs per whorl. The aperture is oval. The siphonal canal is short and slightly recurved to the left. Both lips are smooth. The shell is white, adorned with thin brown spiral stripes, of which ten to twelve are present on the body whorl. The interior is white, featuring two interrupted brown bands on the outer lip.

== Distribution ==
This marine species is endemic to New Zealand.
