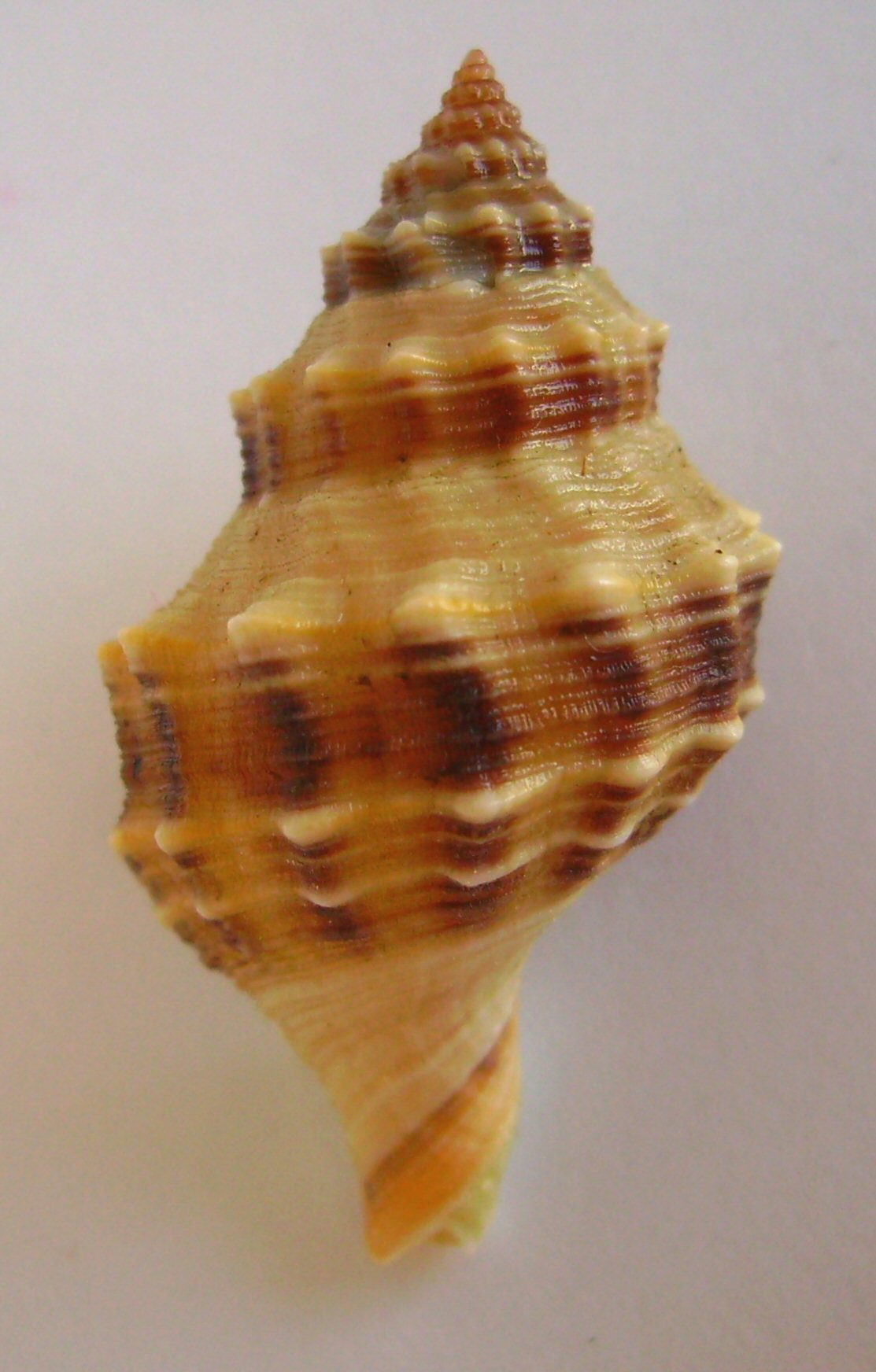
- A dorsal view of a shell of Austrofusus glans

Scientific classification
- Kingdom: Animalia
- Phylum: Mollusca
- Class: Gastropoda
- Subclass: Caenogastropoda
- Order: Neogastropoda
- Family: Prosiphonidae
- Genus: Austrofusus
- Species: A. glans

Binomial name
- Austrofusus glans (Röding, 1798)

Synonyms
- Aethocola glans (Röding, 1798); Austrofusus (Austrofusus) glans (Röding, 1798)· accepted, alternate representation; Austrofusus glans agrestior Finlay, 1927; Austrofusus glans tragulatus Iredale, 1937; Buccinum nodosum Martyn, 1784; Buccinum triton Lesson, 1841; Drupa glans Röding, 1798 (original combination); Fusus nodosus Gray, 1843; Fusus raphanus Lamarck, 1816; Siphonalia nodosa (Martyn, 1784)

= Austrofusus glans =

Species of gastropod

Austrofusus glans is a species of medium-sized sea snail or whelk, a marine gastropod mollusc in the family Prosiphonidae.

formerly of the family Buccinidae.

== Description ==
Austrofusus glans is a medium-sized species of buccinid whelk. The species occurs in shallow, subtidal depths down to at least 600 metres on sandy or soft-bottom sediments.

(Described as Buccinum triton) The shell is ovate-elongate, swollen, and broad, and it is marked with transverse striations composed of very fine striae. It consists of six convex whorls, which are somewhat angled at the middle and encircled with a band of conical tubercles.

The aperture is oblong and milky in color. The outer lip has a wavy margin, and the spire is twisted, broad, and sinuous. The siphonal canal is wide and well-developed.

== Distribution ==
The marine species is endemic to New Zealand.
