= Harold Finlay =

New Zealand palaeontologist and conchologist

- Born: Harold John Finlay; 22 March 1901; Comilla, British India
- Died: 7 April 1951 (aged 50); Wellington, New Zealand
- Education: University of Otago
- Spouse: Jean Dorothy Waterson Gillies
- Awards: Hector Memorial Medal (Royal Society of New Zealand)
- Scientific career
- Fields: Malacofauna of New Zealand
- Institutions: Geological Survey of New Zealand

Harold John Finlay (22 March 1901 – 7 April 1951) was a New Zealand palaeontologist and conchologist.

== Biography ==
Finlay was born in Comilla, India (now Bangladesh), on 22 March 1901, to a family of Baptist missionaries. He was left a paraplegic after contracting poliomyelitis at the age of four, but was able to participate in field excursions. The family moved to Dunedin in 1906. He graduated from the University of Otago with B.Sc. and M.Sc. He received the Hamilton Memorial Prize of the New Zealand Institute in 1926 and a D.Sc. in 1927. His main research interest was marine and non-marine malacofauna of New Zealand, both recent and fossil. Much of his work focused on mollusc taxonomy and biostratigraphy.

After graduation, Finlay ran into financial hardship, living off of research grants, and occasional work as a contract consultant for oil exploration companies. Finlay was appointed to the Geological Survey of New Zealand in 1937, where he worked a micropaleontologist studying Foraminifera. Due to this shift in scope, Finlay sold his mollusc collection to the Auckland Institute and Museum, of which there were an estimated 14,000 specimen lots, and 437 type specimens for the species that Finlay had described.

He was elected a Fellow of the Royal Society of New Zealand in 1939, and was awarded the society's Hector Memorial Medal in 1941.

Finlay died, unexpectedly, at his home in Wellington on 7 April 1951.

== Personal life ==
Finlay married Jean Dorothy Waterson Gillies in 1937.

== Bibliography ==
Many of Finlay's works were published in Transactions and Proceedings of the Royal Society of New Zealand abbreviated as Trans. N.Z. Inst.

(incomplete; complete only for publications from Trans. N.Z. Inst.)

1923

- Finlay H. J. 1923. Some Remarks on New Zealand Calliostomidae, with Descriptions of New Tertiary Species. Trans. N.Z. Inst., vol. 54, pp. 99–105.
- Finlay H. J. & McDowall F. H. 1923. Fossiliferous Limestone at Dowling Bay. Trans. N.Z. Inst., vol. 54, pp. 106–114.

1924

- Finlay H. J. 1924. A Chemical Investigation of Pintsch Oil. Trans. N.Z. Inst., Volume 55, 1924,
- Finlay H. J. 1924. Three Fossil Annelids new to New Zealand. Trans. N.Z. Inst., Volume 55, 1924,
- Finlay H. J. 1924. New shells from New Zealand Tertiary Beds. Trans. N.Z. Inst., vol. 55, 1924, pp. 450–479.
- Finlay H. J. 1924. New Zealand Tertiary Rissoids. Trans. N.Z. Inst. vol 55, 1924, pp. 480–490.
- Finlay H. J. 1924. The Molluscan Fauna of Target Gully. Trans. N.Z. Inst., vol 55, 1924, pp. 494–516.
- Finlay H. J. 1924. Additions to the Recent Molluscan Fauna of New Zealand. Trans. N.Z. Inst., vol 55, 1924, pp. 517–526.
- Finlay H. J. 1924. The Family Liotiidae, Iredale, in the New Zealand Tertiary: Part 1—The Genus Brookula. Trans. N.Z. Inst., vol 55, 1924, pp. 526–531.
- Finlay H. J. & McDowall F. H. 1924. Preliminary Note on the Clifden Beds. Trans. N.Z. Inst., vol. 55, pp. 534–538.
- Finlay H. J. 1924. Two New Species of Magadina. Trans. N.Z. Inst., Volume 55, 1924,
- Finlay H. J. 1924. Some necessary changes in Names of New Zealand Mollusca. Proc. Mal. Soc. (Lond.), vol. 16, pt. 2, pp. 99–107.
- Finlay H. J. 1924. List of Recorded Relationships between Australian and New Zealand Mollusca. Rep. Austr. Assoc. Adv. Sci., vol. 16, pp. 332–343.

1925

- Finlay H. J. 1925 Some Modern Conceptions Applied to the Study of the Caenozoic Mollusca of New Zealand. Verbeek Mem. Birthday Vol., pp. 161–172.

1926

- Finlay H. J. 1926 New Shells from New Zealand Tertiary Beds: Part 2. Trans. N.Z. Inst., vol. 56, 1926, pp. 227–258.
- Finlay H. J. 1926 On Iredalina, new genus: a Volute without plaits. Proc. Mal. Soc. (Lond.), vol. 17, pt. 1, pp. 59–62.

1927

- Finlay H. J. 1927. Additions to the Recent Molluscan Fauna of New Zealand.—No. 2. Trans. N.Z. Inst., Volume 57, 1927, pp. 485–487
- Finlay H. J. (19 January) 1927. New Specific Names for Austral Mollusca. Trans. N.Z. Inst., Volume 57, 1927, pp. 488–533.
- Finlay H. J. (23 December) 1927. A Further Commentary on New Zealand Molluscan Systematics. Transactions and Proceedings of the Royal Society of New Zealand, Volume 57, 1927, 320-485.

1928

- Finlay H. J. 1928. The Recent Mollusca of the Chatham Islands. Trans. N.Z. Inst., Volume 59, 1928, pp. 232–286

1930

- Finlay H. J. (23 August) 1930. Additions to the Recent Molluscan Fauna of New Zealand. No. 3. Trans. N.Z. Inst., Volume 61, 222-247. (PDF)
- Finlay H. J. 1930. Invalid Molluscan Names. No. 1. Trans. N.Z. Inst., Volume 61, 1930
- Finlay H. J. 1930. New Shells from New Zealand Tertiary Beds. Part 3. Trans. N.Z. Inst., Volume 61, 1930, pp. 49–84
- Finlay H. J. 1930. Notes on Recent Papers dealing with the Mollusca of New Zealand. Trans. N.Z. Inst., Volume 61, 1930, pp. 248–258
- Finlay H. J. 1930. Revision of the New Zealand. Shells Referred to Fusinus. Trans. N.Z. Inst., Volume 61, 1930

1931

- Finlay H. J. 1931–1932. On Turbo postulatus Bartrum: Does it indicate a Pliocene Connection with Australia? Trans. N.Z. Inst., Volume 62, 1931–32
- Finlay H. J. 1931–1932. On Austrosassia, Austroharpa, and Austrolithes, New Genera; with some Remarks on the Gasteropod Protoconch. Trans. N.Z. Inst., Volume 62, 1931–32, pp. 7–19
- Finlay H. J. 1931–1932. On the Occurrence of Strebloceras in New Zealand. Trans. N.Z. Inst., Volume 62, 1931–32
- Finlay H. J. & Laws C. R. (23 May) 1931. A Second Species of Planorbis from New Zealand. Trans. N.Z. Inst. Volume 62, 1931–32. 23-25.

1938

- Finlay H. J. 1938–1939. New Zealand Foraminifera: Key Species in Stratigraphy—No. 1. Trans. N.Z. Inst., Volume 68, 1938–39,
- Finlay H. J. 1938–1939. New Zealand Foraminifera: The Occurrence of Rzehakina, Hantkenina, Rotaliatina, and Zeauvigerina. Trans. N.Z. Inst., Volume 68, 1938–39

1940

- Finlay H. J. 1940. New Zealand Foraminifera: Key Species in Stratigraphy. No. 2. Trans. N.Z. Inst., Volume 69, 1940
- Finlay H. J. & Marwick J. 1940. The Divisions of the Upper Cretaceous and Tertiary in New Zealand. Trans. Roy. Soc. N.Z., vol. 70, pp. 77–135.

1946

- Finlay H. J. 1946–1947. The Microfaunas of the Oxford Chalk and Eyre River Beds. Trans. N.Z. Inst., Volume 76, 1946–47,
- Finlay H. J. 1946–1947. The Foraminiferal Evidence for Tertiary Trans-Tasman Correlation. Trans. N.Z. Inst., Volume 76, 1946–47

1947

- Finlay H. J. & Marwick J. 1947. New Divisions of the New Zealand Upper Cretaceous and Tertiary. N.Z. Journ. Sci. Tech., vol. 28, (sec. B), pp. 230–236.

1950

- Benson W. N. & Finlay H. J. 1950. A Post-Tertiary Micro-Fauna in a Concretion Containing Cancer novae-zealandiae. Trans. N.Z. Inst., Volume 78, 1950, 269-270.
