= Taiwan spurdog =

Conservation status
- Endangered (IUCN 3.1)

Scientific classification
- Kingdom: Animalia
- Phylum: Chordata
- Class: Chondrichthyes
- Subclass: Elasmobranchii
- Division: Selachii
- Order: Squaliformes
- Family: Squalidae
- Genus: Squalus
- Species: S. formosus

Binomial name
- Squalus formosus W. T. White & Iglésias, 2011

Species of shark

The Taiwan spurdog (Squalus formosus) is a species of shark in the genus Squalus. It was accidentally found in Taiwan's Tashi fish market by William Toby White and a colleague of the CSIRO in Hobart, Australia. They named it S. formosus ("Formosa" being a former name for Taiwan). It has also been recorded from the coast of Japan, near Kyushu and Shikoku.

Sharks now identified as Squalus formosus had earlier been classified as Squalus blainville, a species that is no longer considered to occur in Taiwan. Squalus formosus can be morphologically separated from the other three Squalus species found in Taiwanese waters (which are S. brevirostris, S. japonicus and S. mitsukurii); it is morphologically more similar to Squalus albifrons from eastern Australia than the other Taiwanese species. Similarly, genetic methods identify S. albifrons as the closest relative of S. formosus.

It is a medium-sized species of Squalus that can reach at least 81 cm (32 in) TL.
