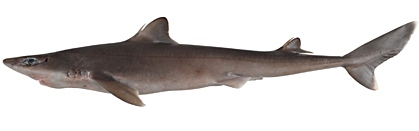

Conservation status
- Endangered (IUCN 3.1)

Scientific classification
- Kingdom: Animalia
- Phylum: Chordata
- Class: Chondrichthyes
- Subclass: Elasmobranchii
- Division: Selachii
- Order: Squaliformes
- Family: Squalidae
- Genus: Squalus
- Species: S. chloroculus

Binomial name
- Squalus chloroculus Last, White & Motomura, 2007

= Greeneye spurdog =

Dogfish described in 2007

The greeneye spurdog (Squalus chloroculus) is a species of dogfish described in 2007. It is a member of the family Squalidae, found off the coast of southeastern Australia. The length of the longest specimen measured is 85.6 cm (33.7 in). It was considered conspecific with the shortspine spurdog.

== Taxonomy ==
The widely-distributed shortspine spurdog (Squalus mitsukurii) was found to comprise a number of distinct species; populations from southern Australian waters were described as Squalus chloroculus in 2007, the holotype collected off Portland, Victoria in 1998. The species name is derived from the Ancient Greek chloros "green" and Latin oculus "eye".

== Description ==
The greeneye spurdog is a robust dogfish with a fusiform body shape, bright green eyes, and overall grey colour. The underparts are paler: paler grey chin and throat to grey-white along the body and tail. The dorsal fins are pale grey with black margins. The pectoral and pelvic fins are grey with paler trailing edges and undersurfaces. The caudal fin is mostly grey with a dark patch over the notch.

== Distribution and habitat ==
The species lives in waters off southern and eastern Australia from Eucla in Western Australia to Jervis Bay in New South Wales, on the upper and middle continental slope from depths of 216 to 1,360 metres (709 to 4,462 ft).

The greeneye spurdog is one of four species identified as threatened with extinction by trawling in a 2021 report. The species is caught up in demersal trawling and automatic longline fishing on the upper continental slope by the Southern and Eastern Scalefish and Shark fishery and the Great Australian Bight Trawl Fishery.
