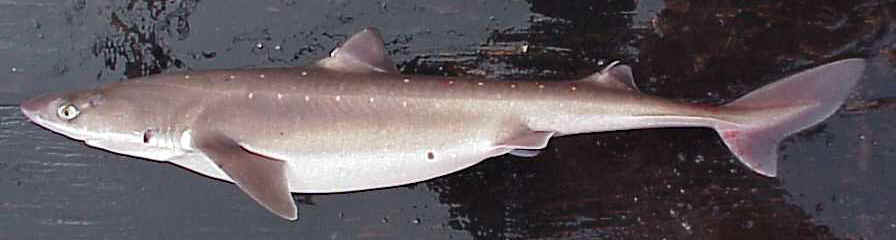
- Spiny dogfish (Squalus acanthias)

Scientific classification
- Kingdom: Animalia
- Phylum: Chordata
- Class: Chondrichthyes
- Subclass: Elasmobranchii
- Division: Selachii
- Order: Squaliformes
- Family: Squalidae
- Genus: Squalus; Linnaeus, 1758

Type species
- Squalus acanthias Linnaeus, 1758

Synonyms
- Squalis Radermacher, 1779 (Missp.); Acanthorhinus de Blainville, 1816; Acanthias Leach, 1818; Flakeus Whitley, 1939; Koinga Whitley, 1939

= Spurdog =

Spurdogs Temporal range: 89.8–0 Ma Campanian to Present

Genus of sharks

Squalus is a genus of dogfish sharks in the family Squalidae. Commonly known as spurdogs, these sharks are characterized by smooth dorsal fin spines, teeth in upper and lower jaws similar in size, caudal peduncle with lateral keels; upper precaudal pit usually present, and caudal fin without subterminal notch. In spurdogs, the hyomandibula (the bone connecting the braincase to the jaws) is oriented at a right angle to the neurocranium, while in other sharks, the hyomandibula runs more parallel to the body. This led some to think that the upper jaw of Squalus would not be as protractile as the jaws of other sharks. However, a study that compared different jaw suspension types in sharks showed that this is not the case and that Squalus is quite capable of protruding its upper jaw during feeding.

The name comes from squalus, the Latin for shark; this word is the root for numerous words related to sharks such as squaline and scientific names for sharks, such as the order Squaliformes.

== Species ==
Currently, 41 recognized species are placed in this genus:

- Squalus acanthias Linnaeus, 1758 (spiny dogfish)
- Squalus acutipinnis Regan, 1908 (bluntnose spurdog)
- Squalus acutirostris Chu, Meng & Li, 1984 (Chinese shortnose spurdog)
- Squalus albicaudus Viana, M. R. de Carvalho & U. L. Gomes, 2016 (Brazilian whitetail dogfish)
- Squalus albifrons Last, W. T. White & J. D. Stevens, 2007 (eastern highfin spurdog)
- Squalus altipinnis Last, W. T. White & J. D. Stevens, 2007 (western highfin spurdog)
- Squalus bahiensis Viana, M. R. de Carvalho & U. L. Gomes, 2016 (northeastern Brazilian dogfish)
- Squalus bassi Viana, De Carvalho & Ebert, 2017 (long-snouted African spurdog)
- Squalus blainville (A. Risso, 1827) (longnose spurdog)
- Squalus boretzi Dolganov, 2019 (emperor dogfish)
- Squalus brevirostris S. Tanaka (I), 1917 (Japanese shortnose spurdog)
- Squalus bucephalus Last, Séret & Pogonoski, 2007 (bighead spurdog)
- Squalus chloroculus Last, W. T. White & Motomura, 2007 (greeneye spurdog)
- Squalus clarkae Pfleger, Grubbs, Cotton & Daly-Engel, 2018 (Genie's dogfish)
- Squalus crassispinus Last, M. J. Edmunds & Yearsley, 2007 (fatspine spurdog)
- Squalus cubensis Howell-Rivero, 1936 (Cuban dogfish)
- Squalus edmundsi W. T. White, Last & J. D. Stevens, 2007 (Edmund's spurdog)
- Squalus formosus W. T. White & Iglésias, 2011 (Taiwan spurdog)
- Squalus grahami W. T. White, Last & J. D. Stevens, 2007 (eastern longnose spurdog)
- Squalus griffini Phillipps, 1931 (northern spiny dogfish)
- Squalus hawaiiensis Daly-Engel, Koch, Anderson, Cotton, Grubbs, 2018 (Hawaiian spurdog)
- Squalus hemipinnis W. T. White, Last & Yearsley, 2007 (Indonesian shortsnout spurdog)
- Squalus hima Swetha, Bineesh, Beira, Das, & Bhaskar, 2024 (Indian spurdog)
- Squalus japonicus Ishikawa, 1908 (Japanese spurdog)
- Squalus lalannei Baranes, 2003 (Seychelles spurdog)
- Squalus lobularis Viana, M. R. de Carvalho & U. L. Gomes, 2016 (Atlantic lobefin dogfish)
- Squalus longispinis Fricke, Durville, Potin & Mulochau, 2023 (La Réunion longspine spurdog)
- Squalus mahia Viana, Lisher & De Carvalho, 2017 (Malagasy skinny spurdog)
- Squalus margaretsmithae Viana, Lisher & De Carvalho, 2017 (Smith's dogfish shark)
- Squalus megalops (W. J. Macleay, 1881) (shortnose spurdog)
- Squalus melanurus Fourmanoir & Rivaton, 1979 (blacktailed spurdog)
- Squalus mitsukurii D. S. Jordan & Snyder, 1903 (shortspine spurdog)
- Squalus montalbani Whitley, 1931 (Indonesian greeneye spurdog)
- Squalus nasutus Last, L. J. Marshall & W. T. White, 2007 (western longnose spurdog)
- Squalus notocaudatus Last, W. T. White & J. D. Stevens, 2007 (bartail spurdog)
- Squalus probatovi Myagkov & Kondyurin, 1986 (southern dogfish)
- Squalus quasimodo Viana, M. R. de Carvalho & U. L. Gomes, 2016 (humpback western dogfish)
- Squalus rancureli Fourmanoir & Rivaton, 1979 (Cyrano spurdog)
- Squalus raoulensis Duffy & Last, 2007 (Kermadec spiny dogfish)
- Squalus shiraii Viana & M. R. de Carvalho, 2020 (Shirai's spurdog)
- Squalus suckleyi (Girard, 1855) (Pacific spiny dogfish)
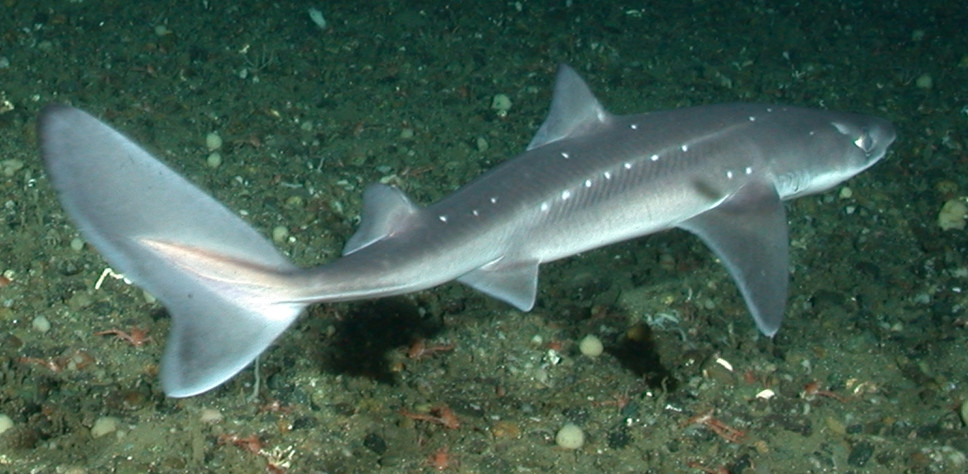
Squalus suckleyi

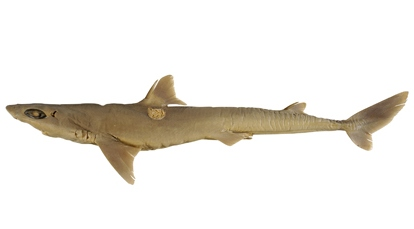
Squalus altipinnis

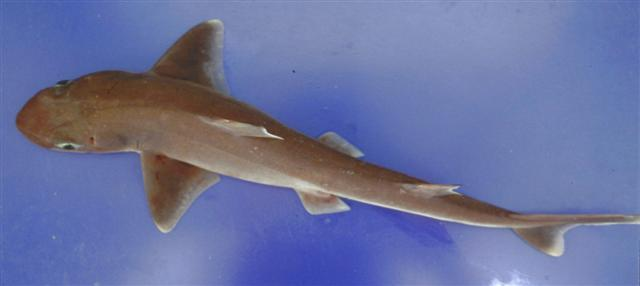
Squalus blainville

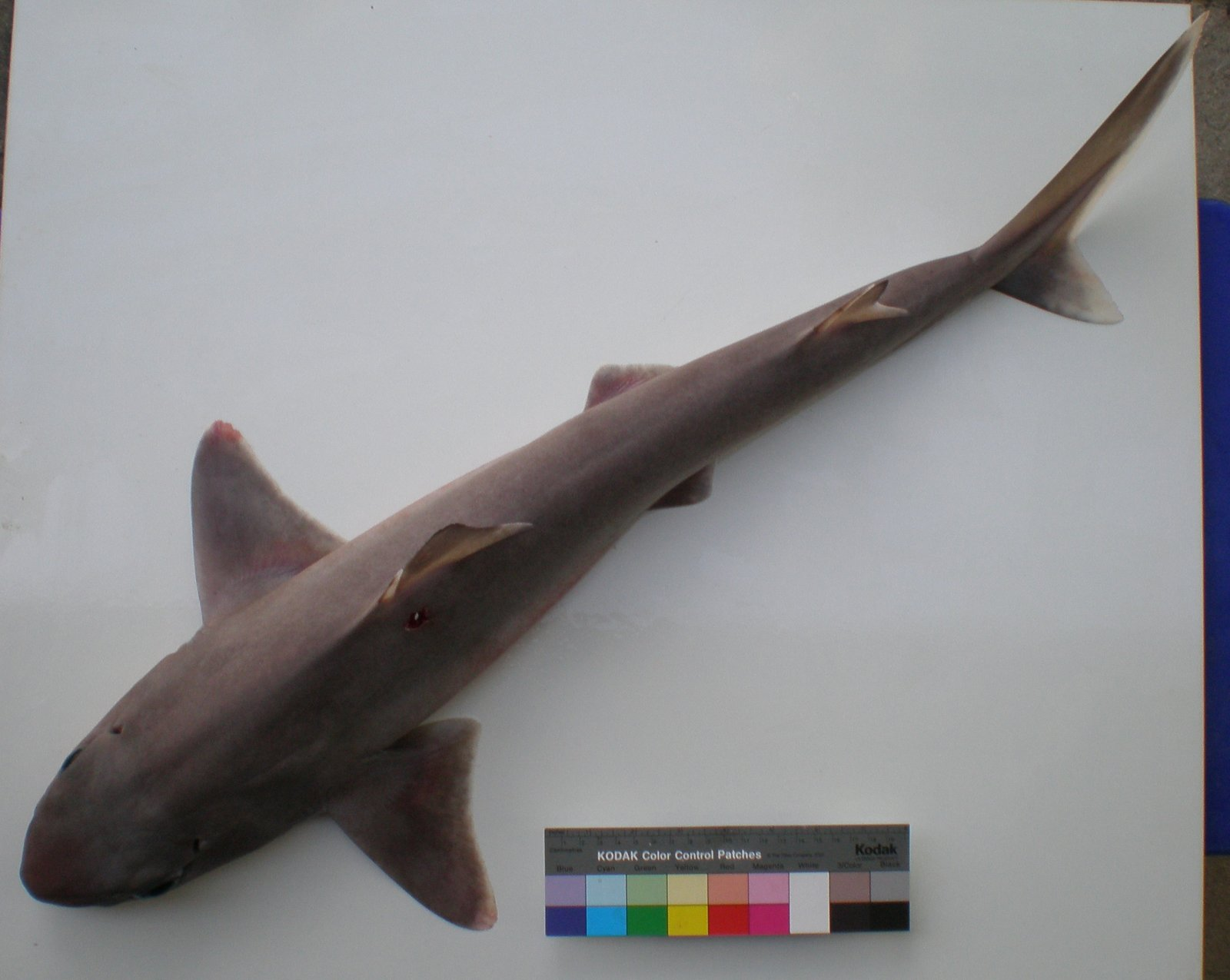
Squalus bucephalus

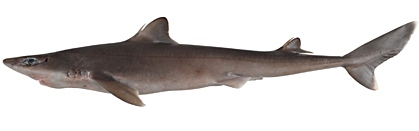
Squalus chloroculus

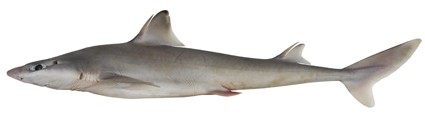
Squalus crassispinus

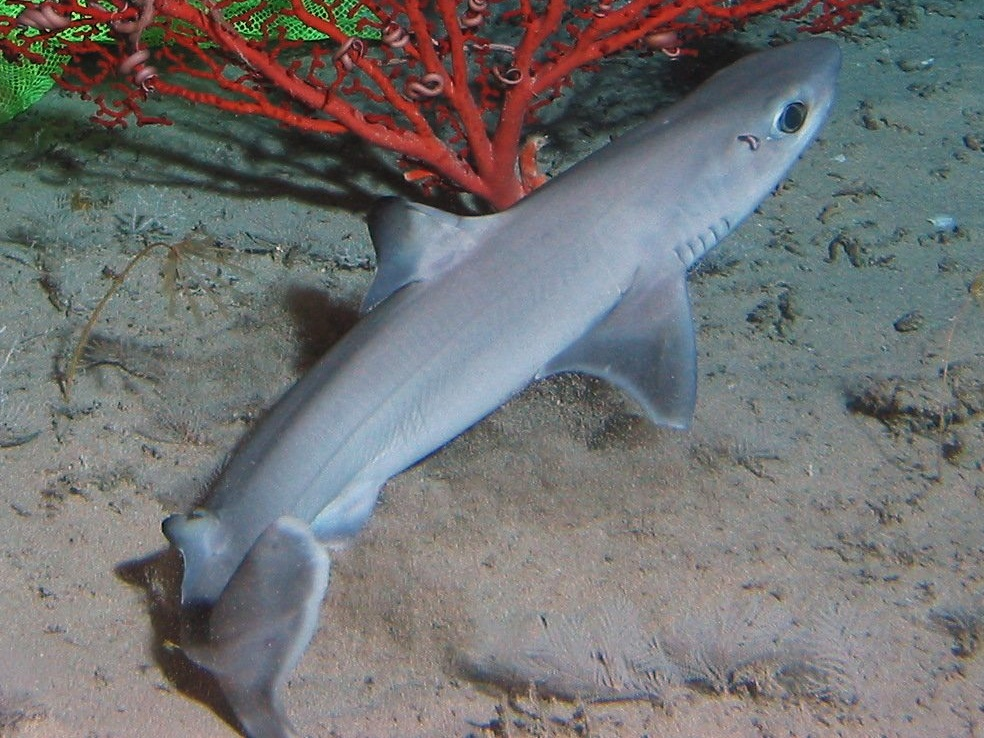
Squalus cubensis

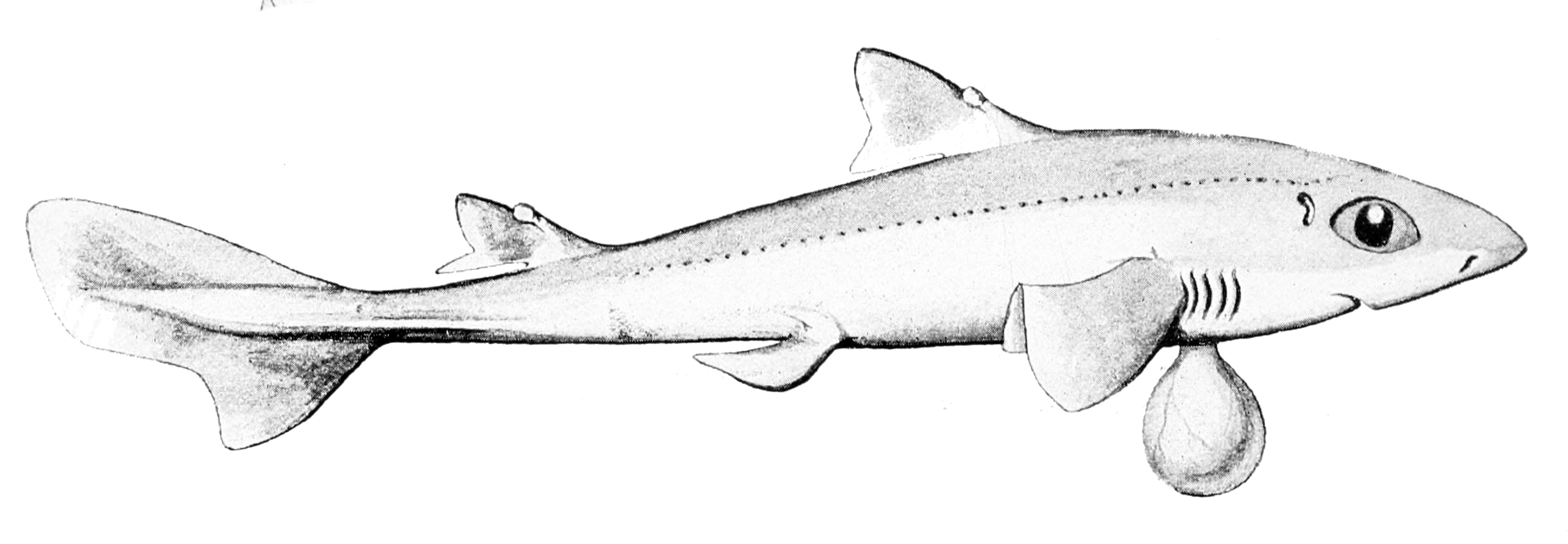
Squalus megalops

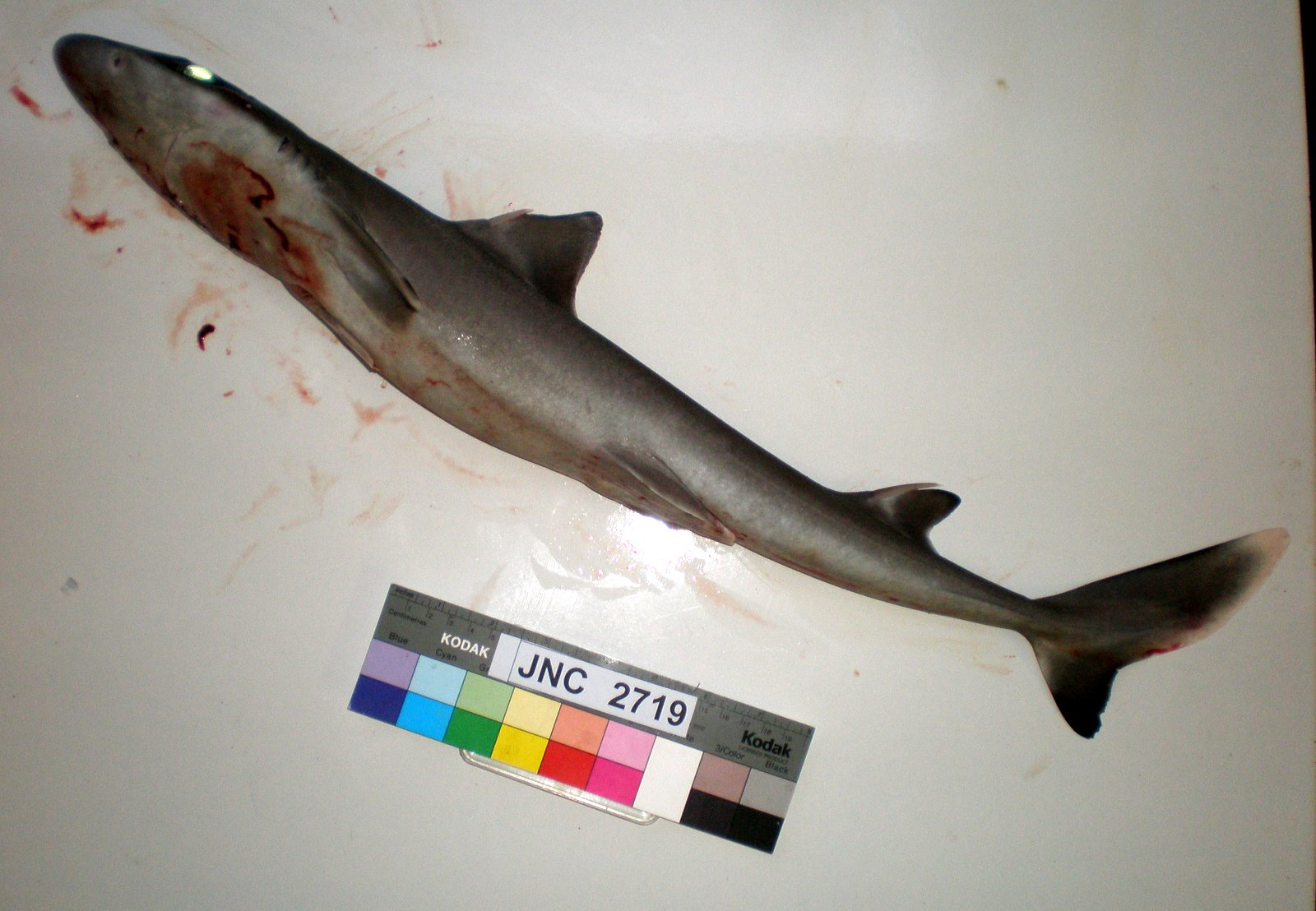
Squalus melanurus

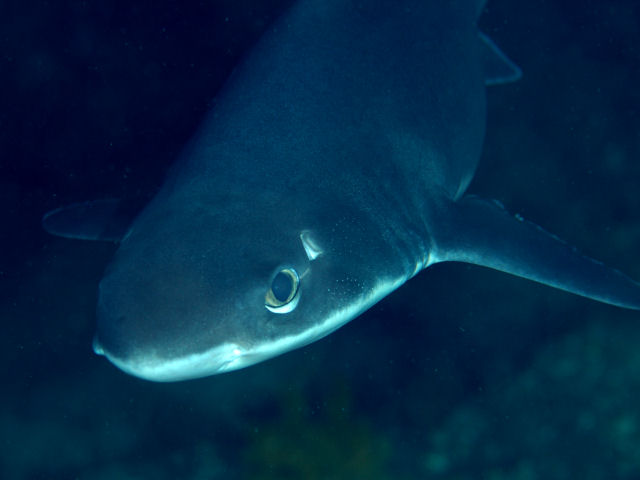
Squalus mitsukurii

== See also ==
- List of prehistoric cartilaginous fish genera
