= Edmund's spurdog =

Conservation status
- Near Threatened (IUCN 3.1)

Scientific classification
- Kingdom: Animalia
- Phylum: Chordata
- Class: Chondrichthyes
- Subclass: Elasmobranchii
- Division: Selachii
- Order: Squaliformes
- Family: Squalidae
- Genus: Squalus
- Species: S. edmundsi

Binomial name
- Squalus edmundsi White, Last, & J. D. Stevens, 2007

Species of shark

Edmund's spurdog (Squalus edmundsi) is a dogfish described in 2007. It is a member of the family Squalidae, found off western Australia and Indonesia. The length of the longest specimen measured is 70.0 cm (27.6 in).
