= Squalus nasutus =

Conservation status
- Near Threatened (IUCN 3.1)

Scientific classification
- Kingdom: Animalia
- Phylum: Chordata
- Class: Chondrichthyes
- Subclass: Elasmobranchii
- Division: Selachii
- Order: Squaliformes
- Family: Squalidae
- Genus: Squalus
- Species: S. nasutus

Binomial name
- Squalus nasutus Last, L. J. Marshall & W. T. White, 2007

Species of shark

Squalus nasutus, the western longnose spurdog, is a dogfish of the family Squalidae, found on the continental shelf off the northwest and southwest coasts of Western Australia, at depths between 300 and 510 m. Its length is at least 55 cm.

Squalus nasutus is a rare, small and slender dogfish with a narrow head and long, narrow snout. A short medial barbel is on the anterior nasal flaps. The pectoral fin has a shallowly concave posterior margin. The first dorsal fin is moderately high with a short spine.

Coloration is light grey above, paler below, with no white spots. The pale dorsal fins have dusky tips and posterior margins. A dark blotch is seen on part of the caudal fin's posterior margin.

Its reproduction is ovoviviparous.
