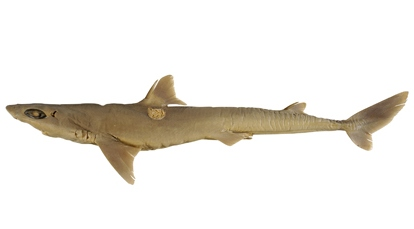

Conservation status
- Data Deficient (IUCN 3.1)

Scientific classification
- Kingdom: Animalia
- Phylum: Chordata
- Class: Chondrichthyes
- Subclass: Elasmobranchii
- Division: Selachii
- Order: Squaliformes
- Family: Squalidae
- Genus: Squalus
- Species: S. altipinnis

Binomial name
- Squalus altipinnis Last, W. T. White & Stevens, 2007

= Squalus altipinnis =

Species of shark

Squalus altipinnis, the western highfin spurdog, is a dogfish of the family Squalidae found on the continental shelf off Western Australia, at depths between 220 and 510 m. Its reproduction is ovoviviparous.
