= Squalus notocaudatus =

Conservation status
- Least Concern (IUCN 3.1)

Scientific classification
- Kingdom: Animalia
- Phylum: Chordata
- Class: Chondrichthyes
- Subclass: Elasmobranchii
- Division: Selachii
- Order: Squaliformes
- Family: Squalidae
- Genus: Squalus
- Species: S. notocaudatus

Binomial name
- Squalus notocaudatus Last, W. T. White & Stevens, 2007

Species of shark

Squalus notocaudatus, the bartail spurdog, is a dogfish of the family Squalidae, found on the continental shelf off Queensland, Australia, at depths between 220 and 450 m. The length of the longest specimen measured, an immature male, is 62 cm (24 in). Its reproduction is ovoviviparous .
