= Indonesian shortsnout spurdog =

Conservation status
- Vulnerable (IUCN 3.1)

Scientific classification
- Kingdom: Animalia
- Phylum: Chordata
- Class: Chondrichthyes
- Subclass: Elasmobranchii
- Division: Selachii
- Order: Squaliformes
- Family: Squalidae
- Genus: Squalus
- Species: S. hemipinnis

Binomial name
- Squalus hemipinnis White, Last, & Yearsley, 2007

Species of shark

The Indonesian shortsnout spurdog (Squalus hemipinnis) is a dogfish described in 2007. It is a member of the family Squalidae, found off Indonesia. The length of the longest specimen measured is 52.2 cm (20.6 in).
