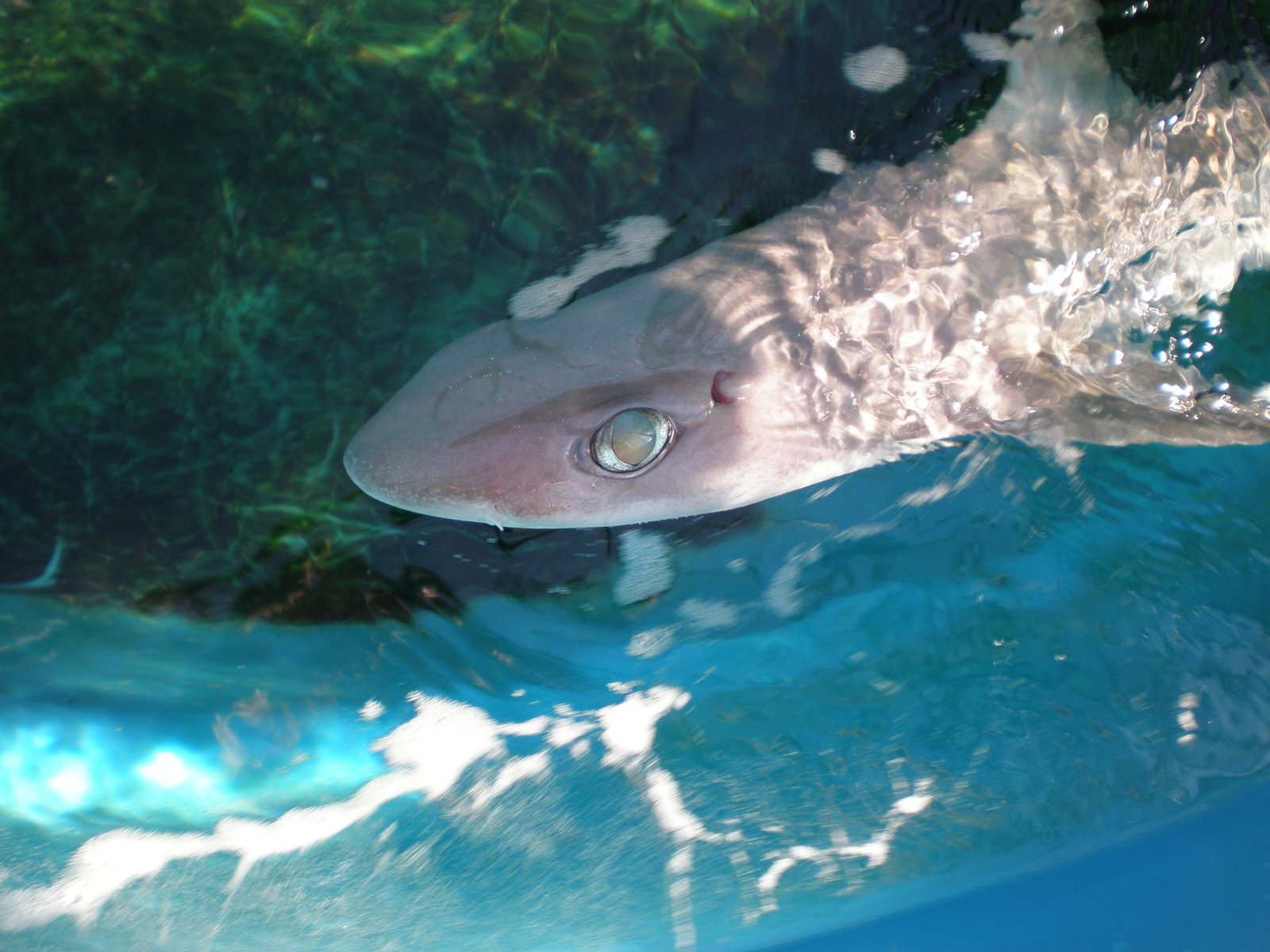

Conservation status
- Data Deficient (IUCN 3.1)

Scientific classification
- Kingdom: Animalia
- Phylum: Chordata
- Class: Chondrichthyes
- Subclass: Elasmobranchii
- Division: Selachii
- Order: Squaliformes
- Family: Squalidae
- Genus: Squalus
- Species: S. bucephalus

Binomial name
- Squalus bucephalus Last, Séret & Pogonoski, 2007
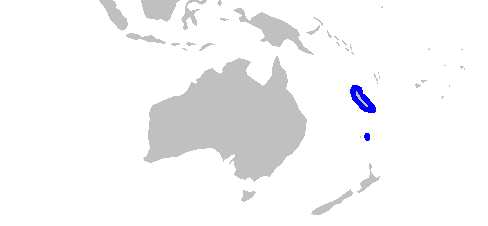
- Range of the bighead spurdog

= Bighead spurdog =

Species of shark

The bighead spurdog (Squalus bucephalus) is a rare and little-known species of dogfish shark in the family Squalidae. It is found in deep water south of New Caledonia, and over the Norfolk Ridge. Reaching at least 90 cm (35 in) in length, this stocky shark is brown above and light below, with a broad head and two dorsal fins with long spines. It is the only member of its genus with both one- and three-pointed dermal denticles. An infrequent bycatch of longline fisheries, this species is listed under Data Deficient by the International Union for Conservation of Nature (IUCN).

== Taxonomy ==
The first specimens of the bighead spurdog were collected during South Pacific biodiversity surveys conducted by the Institut de recherche pour le développement (IRD). The species was described by Peter Last, Bernard Séret, and John Pogonoski in a 2007 Commonwealth Scientific and Industrial Research Organisation (CSIRO) publication. The specific name bucephalus is derived from the Latin bu ("large") and the Greek kephalis ("of the head"). Of the four original specimens, a 56 cm (22 in) long immature male caught over Norfolk Ridge was selected as the holotype. Morphologically, this species belongs to a subgroup of Squalus defined by the shortnose spurdog (S. megalops) and the Cuban dogfish (S. cubensis).

== Description ==
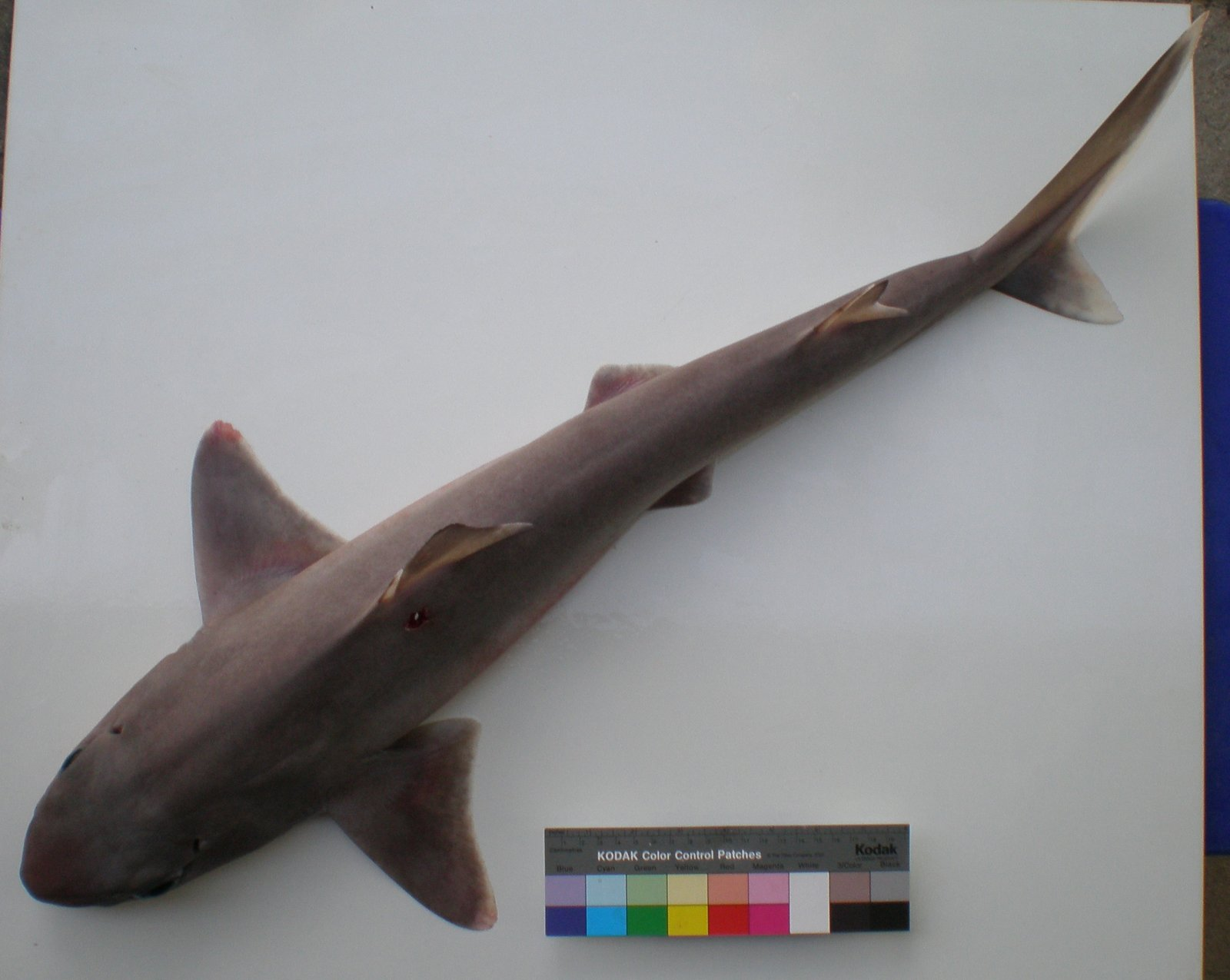
Dorsal view, showing the robust body and broad head of this species

The bighead spurdog is a robustly built, spindle-shaped shark with a hump behind the head. The head is notably broad, and the snout is short and triangular with a blunt tip. The nostrils are preceded by a forked flap of skin. The medium-sized eyes are oval in shape and have a notch in the outside corner; behind them are small, crescent-shaped spiracles. The mouth is nearly straight and bears long furrows at the corners. There are 26–27 upper and 22–24 lower tooth rows. Each tooth has a single angled, knife-like cusp. There are five pairs of gill slits, with the first four pairs small and the fifth pair longer.

The two dorsal fins bear long spines and have narrowly rounded apexes, concave posterior margins, and short free rear tips. The first dorsal fin originates above the pectoral fin insertions; the second is smaller than the first and originates behind the pelvic fins. The pectoral fins are medium-sized with rounded tips, the pelvic fins are small, and there is no anal fin. There are lateral keels on the caudal peduncle. The caudal fin is asymmetrical, with a long upper lobe and a well-developed lower lobe; the trailing margins of both lobes are convex. The skin is covered by tiny, non-overlapping dermal denticles. Unlike other Squalus species, adults have a mix of one-cusped and three-cusped denticles. This species is dark brown above, darkening towards the apexes of the dorsal fins, and pale below. The dorsal fin free rear tips and the caudal fin posterior margin are white. The largest known specimen measures 90 cm (35 in) in length.

== Distribution and habitat ==
The bighead spurdog has only been recorded from the waters south of New Caledonia, and from seamounts on the Norfolk Ridge in the northern Tasman Sea. It has been caught between the depths of 448–800 m (1,470–2,625 ft).

== Biology and ecology ==
Virtually nothing is known about the natural history of the bighead spurdog. Male appear to mature sexually at under 66 cm (26 in) long.

== Human interactions ==
Small numbers of bighead spurdogs are caught incidentally by longliners fishing for ruby snapper (Etelis carbunculus) south of New Caledonia. The International Union for Conservation of Nature (IUCN) presently lacks sufficient data to assess the conservation status of this species.
