= Squalus grahami =

Conservation status
- Near Threatened (IUCN 3.1)

Scientific classification
- Kingdom: Animalia
- Phylum: Chordata
- Class: Chondrichthyes
- Subclass: Elasmobranchii
- Division: Selachii
- Order: Squaliformes
- Family: Squalidae
- Genus: Squalus
- Species: S. grahami

Binomial name
- Squalus grahami W. T. White, Last & Stevens, 2007

Species of shark

Squalus grahami, the eastern longnose spurdog, is a dogfish of the family Squalidae, found off northern Queensland, at depths between 220 and 500 m. Its length is up to 64 cm. Its reproduction is ovoviviparous.
