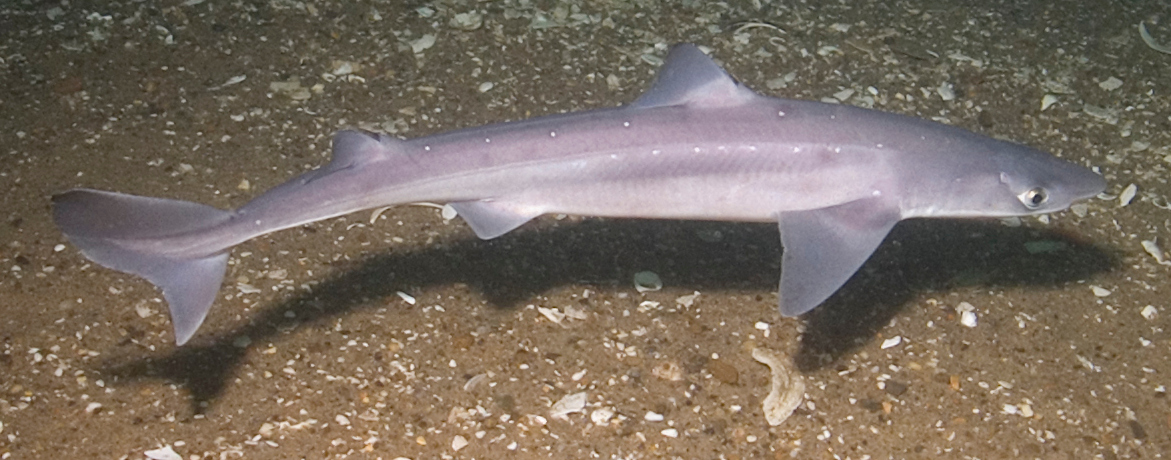

Conservation status
- Vulnerable (IUCN 3.1)

- Imperiled (NatureServe)

Scientific classification
- Kingdom: Animalia
- Phylum: Chordata
- Class: Chondrichthyes
- Subclass: Elasmobranchii
- Division: Selachii
- Order: Squaliformes
- Family: Squalidae
- Genus: Squalus
- Species: S. acanthias

Binomial name
- Squalus acanthias Linnaeus, 1758
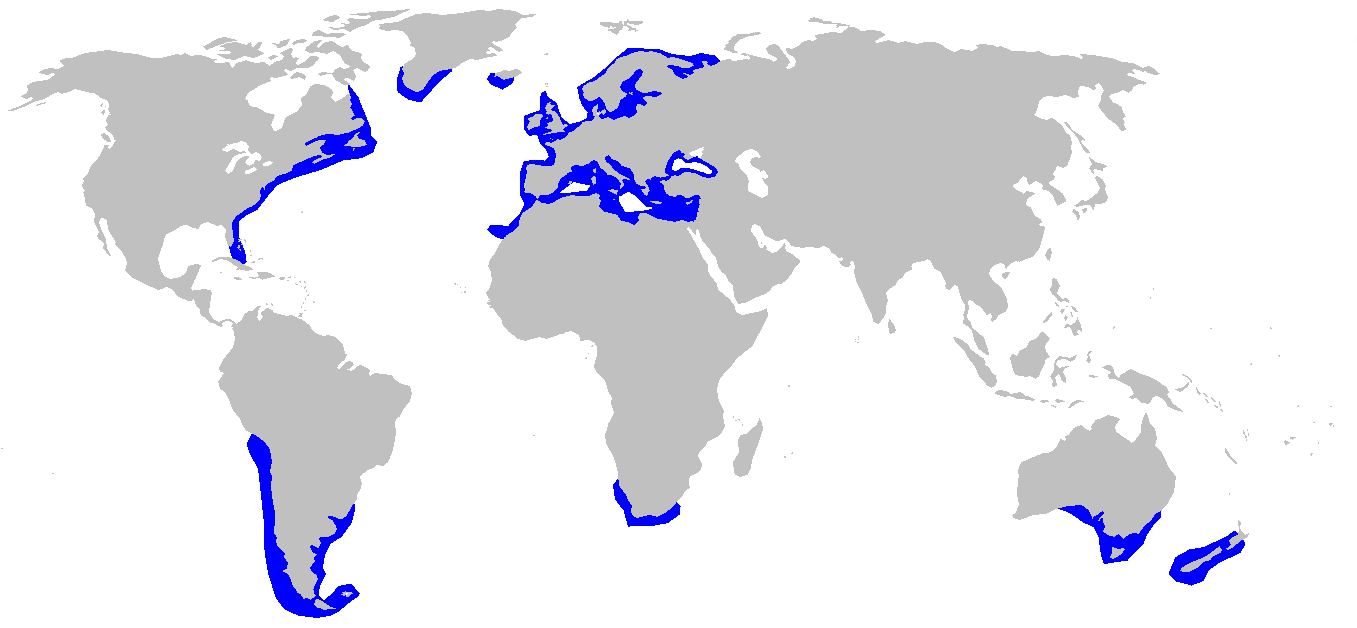
- Range of the spiny dogfish (in blue)

= Spiny dogfish =

Spiny dogfish Temporal range: 11–0 Ma Late Miocene–present

Species of shark

The spiny dogfish (Squalus acanthias), spurdog, mud shark, or piked dogfish is one of the best known species of the Squalidae (dogfishes) family of sharks, which is part of the Squaliformes order.

While these common names may apply to several species, Squalus acanthias is distinguished by two spines (one anterior to each dorsal fin) and no anal fin. It lives in shallow waters and further offshore in most parts of the world, especially in temperate waters. Those in the northern Pacific Ocean were reevaluated in 2010 and found to constitute a separate species, now called the Pacific spiny dogfish (Squalus suckleyi).

== Etymology ==
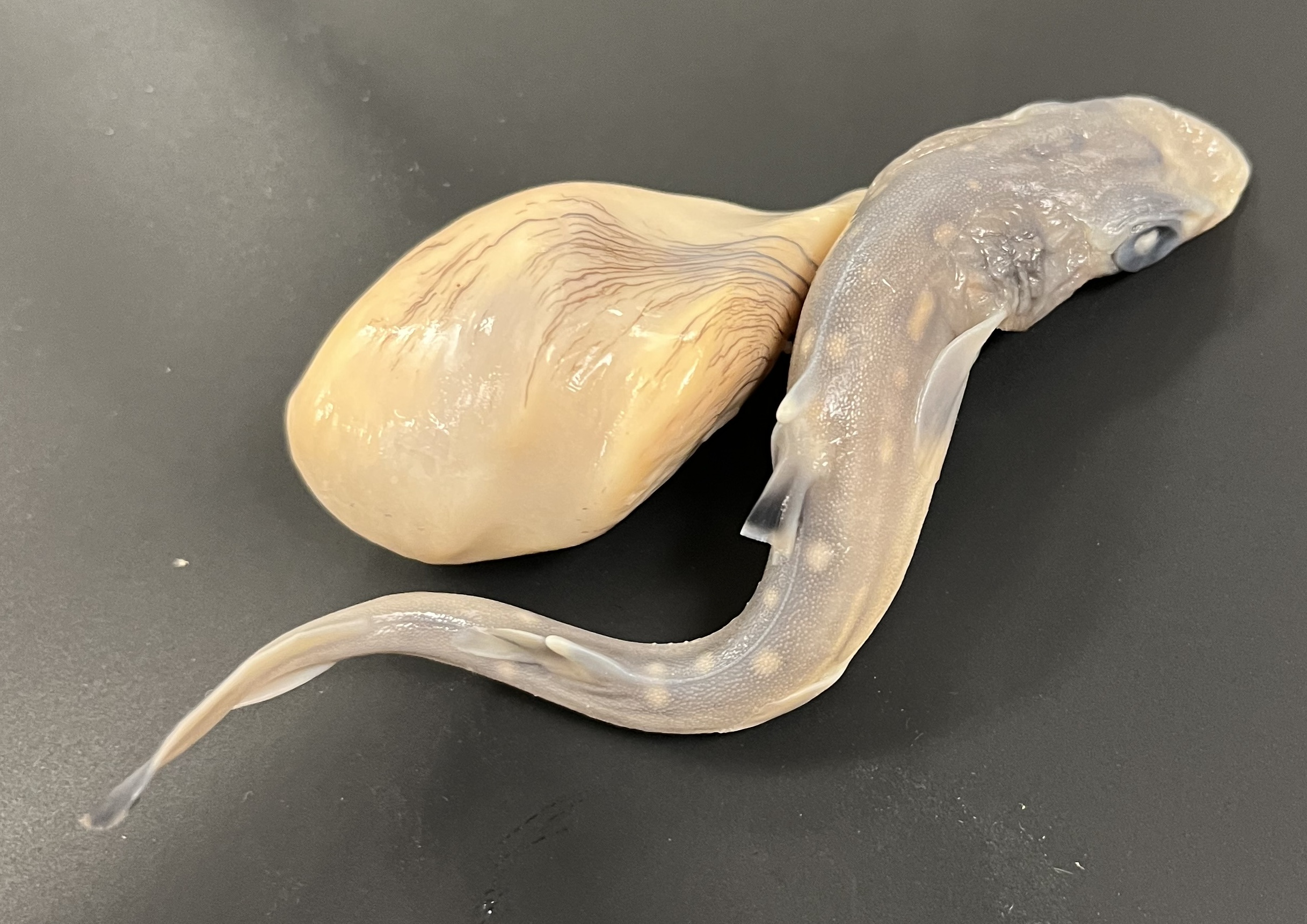
Spiny dogfish pup

"Squalus" means "shark" in Latin, possibly from Indo-European *(s)kʷálos ("sheatfish"), or alternatively related to Latin squāma ("scale").

"Acanthias" derives from Ancient Greek akanthías ("dogfish"), from ákăntha ("thorn").

== Description and behaviour ==
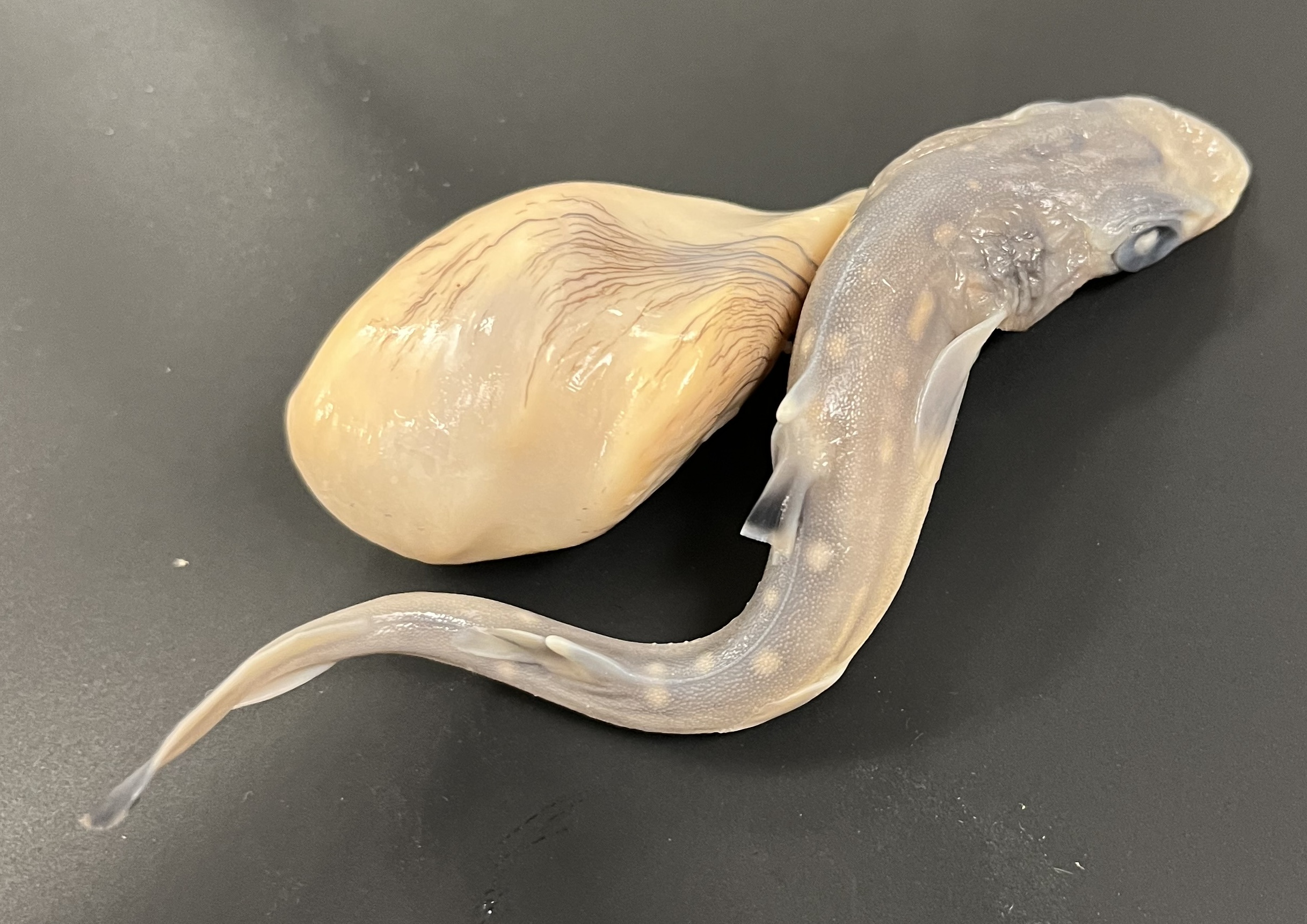
Spiny dogfish pup

The spiny dogfish has dorsal fins, no anal fin, and white spots along its back. The caudal fin has asymmetrical lobes, forming a heterocercal tail. The species name acanthias refers to the shark's two spines. These are used defensively. If captured, the shark can arch its back to pierce its captor with spines near the dorsal fins that secrete a mild venom into its predator.

This shark is known to hunt in packs that can range up into the thousands. They are aggressive hunters and have a sizable diet that can range from squid, fish, crab, jellyfish, sea cucumber, shrimp and other invertebrates.

Dogfish sharks experience one of the longest gestation periods of any organism, which can last from around 18 to 24 months. During spawning season, which occurs during the colder months of winter, females can lay anywhere from 2 to 12 eggs, which develop ovoviviparously and the pups are birthed as live young, with about 5 to 6 in each litter of pups, mainly depending on the size of the female. Reproduction occurs in the winter in offshore waters, while pups are normally born in the warmer and deeper offshore waters where it is harder for humans and predators to reach them. The reproductive cycle begins when females produce several large eggs of yellow coloring, which become fertilized once they pass through the shell gland and are wrapped in what is called a "candle", or a kind of reproductive capsule. One can determine if an egg is fertilized when the blastoderm is visible. The candle passes through the rest of the reproductive tract until it reaches the uterus. Attached to the gill region of the pup is a yolk sac which provides nutrients for them as they develop, which they absorb as they grow. Even after fully absorbing the yolk sac, the pups may live in the uterus for a period of time afterwards during the gestation period. Both sexes are greyish brown in color and are countershaded. Males are identified by a pair of pelvic fins modified as sperm-transfer organs, or "claspers". The male inserts one clasper into the female cloaca during copulation.

In females the size of ova and the state of uteri determines whether sexual maturity has been reached, while in males, clasper length and calcification is the determination factor. Many of the growth patterns show an isometric growth pattern, as the pups have very similar features to the adults. Sexual maturity does not match body size development, they mature quite earlier than one would expect. Most males reach sexual maturity at an earlier ages of around 10 years, growing to be about 60–65 cm (24–26 in) in length. Females take a longer period of time, around 16 years, to reach sexual maturity, and can grow to about 80–84 cm (31–33 in) at that time. Some dogfish have been seen to live nearly 70 years, but the average lifespan is around 30–40 years. Male Spiny dogfish use their claspers to impregnate females, which take time to develop properly, and before reaching sexual maturity, tend to be longer than their pelvic fins. During this time, the testes develop, but no sperm will exist inside until later stages are reached, and genital ducts are deformed compared to adult ducts. Once the adult stage is reached, claspers have elongated, and are now hardened with calcium and are still slightly longer than their pelvic fin. At this point testes are fully developed, and sperm exist within the seminal vesicles, and genital ducts conform to a twisted shape we commonly see in adults.

Spiny dogfish are bottom-dwelling boreal-temperate sharks. They are commonly found within the epipelagic zone at depths of around 50–149 m (160–490 ft), but have been found deeper than 700 m (2,300 ft).

Life span estimates based on analysis of vertebral centra and annuli in the dorsal spines range from 35 to 54 years.

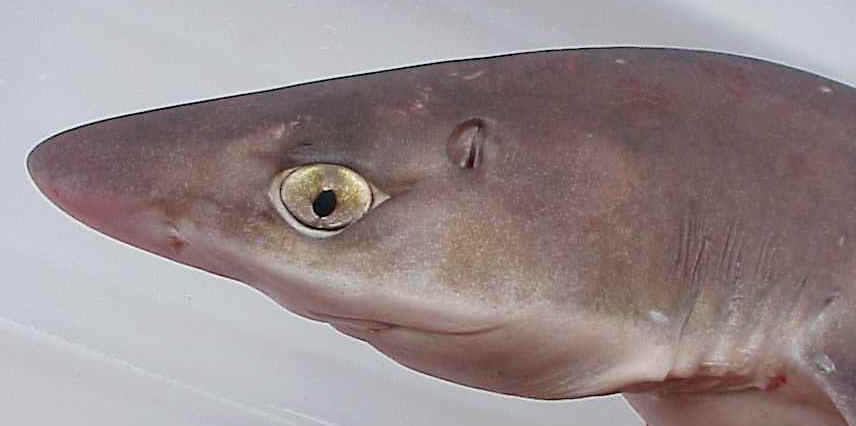
Head

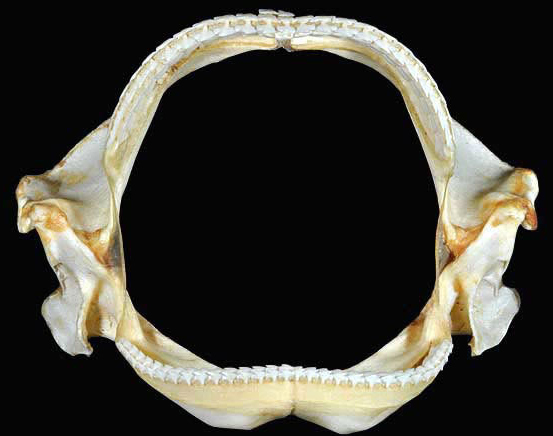
Jaws

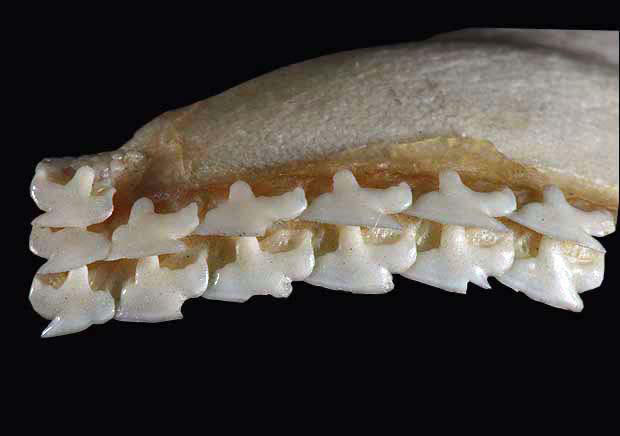
Upper teeth

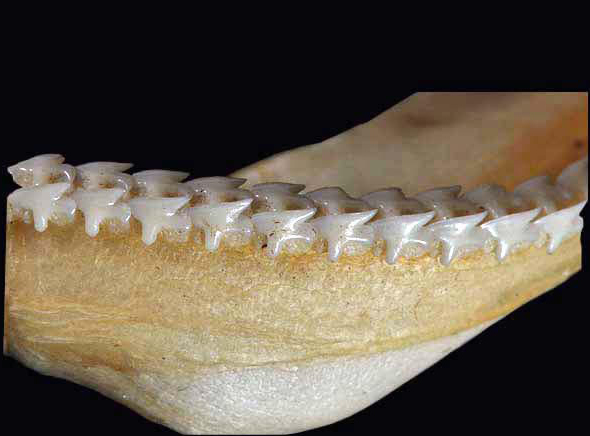
Lower teeth

== Commercial use ==
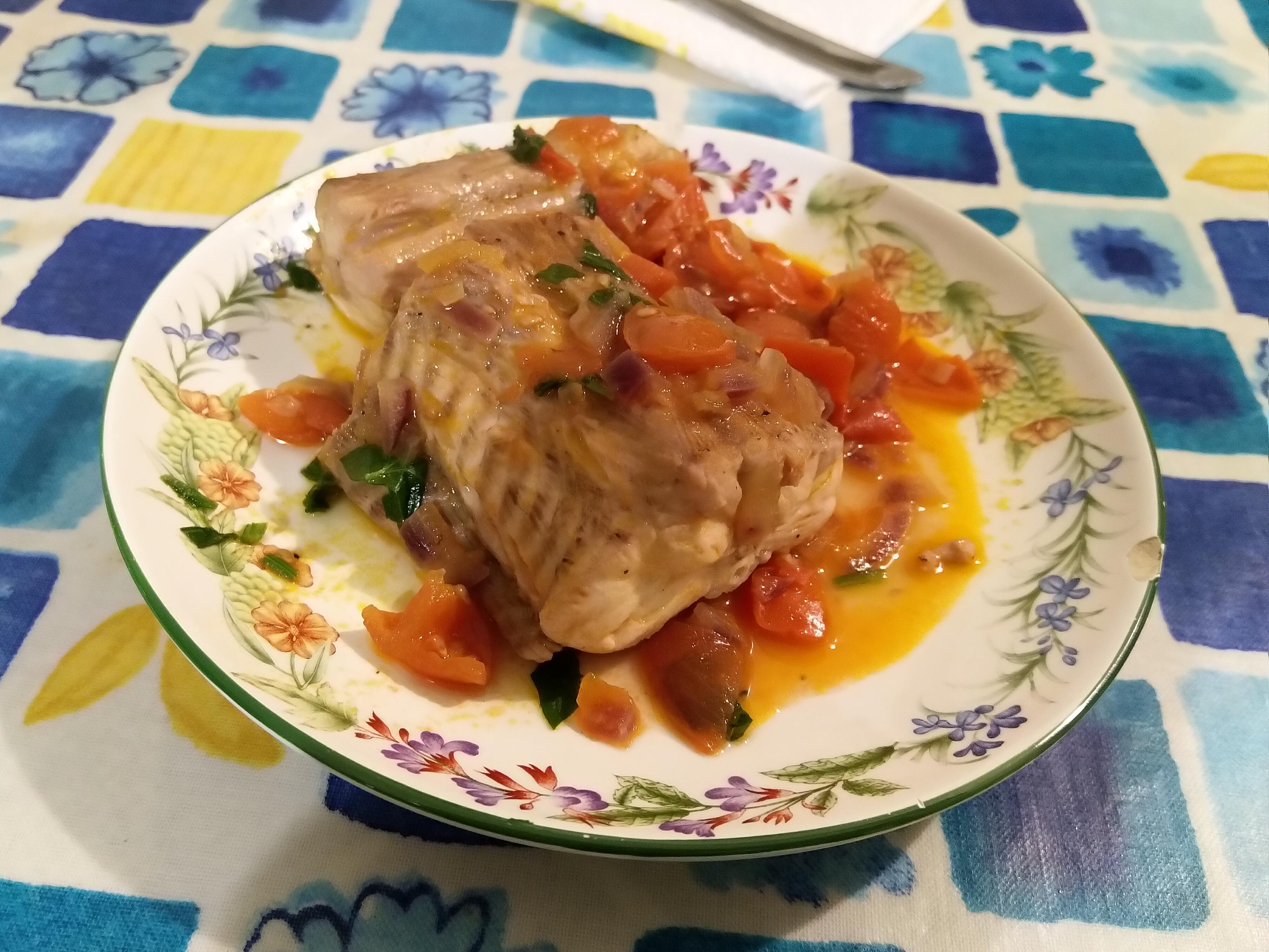
Braised dogfish

Spiny dogfish are sold as food in Europe, the United States, Canada, New Zealand, Venezuela and Chile. The meat is primarily eaten in England, France, Italy, the Benelux countries, Germany, and as an unwitting houndshark in Greece. The fins and tails are processed into fin needles for cheaper versions of shark fin soup in Chinese cuisine. In England, dogfish are bought in fish and chip shops as "huss", and previously as "rock salmon" until the term was outlawed. Commercial harvests were banned in the UK from 2010 until 2023. In France, they are sold as "small salmon" (saumonette) and in Belgium and Germany as "sea eel" (zeepaling and Seeaal, respectively). In Greece, all small dogfish are commercially called galéos, after the critically endangered Galeorhinus galeus that produces a seasonal dish; other small sharks such as the spiny dogfish substitute it.

Spiny dogfish bodies are ground into fertilizer, liver oil and pet food. Because of their availability, cartilaginous skulls and small sizes, they are popular vertebrate dissection specimens in high schools and universities.

Reported catches varied between 31,700 tonnes in 2000 and 13,800 tonnes in 2008. Bottom trawlers and sink gillnets are the primary tools. In Mid-Atlantic and Southern New England fisheries, they are often caught with larger groundfish, classified as bycatch, and discarded. Recreational fishing accounts for an insignificant portion of the spiny dogfish catch.

The Cape Cod Commercial Fishermen's Alliance promotes sustainable use of the dogfish in restaurants and fish markets in the Cape Cod area of Massachusetts, as of 2017, paid for by the National Oceanographic and Atmospheric Administration. It aims to persuade diners to buy less-popular fish.

== Conservation status and management ==
Once the most abundant shark species in the world, populations of Squalus acanthias have declined significantly. They are classified in the IUCN Red List of threatened species as Vulnerable globally and Critically endangered in the Northeast Atlantic, meaning stocks around Europe have decreased by at least 95%. This is a direct result of overfishing to supply northern Europe's taste for rock salmon, saumonette, and zeepaling. Despite these alarming figures, very few management or conservation measures are in place for Squalus acanthias. In EU waters, a Total Allowable Catch (TAC) has been in place since 1999, but until 2007 it only applied to ICES Areas IIa and IV. It was also set well above the actual weight of fish being caught until 2005, rendering it meaningless. Since 2009 a maximum landing size of one metre (3 ft 3 in) has been imposed in order to protect the most valuable mature females. The TAC for 2011 was set at 0 tons, ending targeted fishing for the species in EU waters. It remains to be seen if populations will be able to recover.

In the recent past the European market for spiny dogfish has increased dramatically, which led to the overfishing and decline of the species. This drastic increase led to the creation and implementation of many fishery management policies placing restrictions on the fishing of spiny dogfish. However, since the species is a late-maturing fish, it takes a while to rebuild the population.

In 2010, Greenpeace International added the spiny dogfish to its seafood red list. "The Greenpeace International seafood red list is a list of fish that are commonly sold in supermarkets around the world, and which have a very high risk of being sourced from unsustainable fisheries." In the same year, the Convention on Migratory Species (CMS; also known as the Bonn Convention) listed the species (Northern Hemisphere populations) under Annex I of its Migratory Shark Memorandum of Understanding.

In recent years, however, the US has implemented fishing controls and opened up the fishery. The proposed quota for 2011 was 16.1 million kilograms (35.5 million lb) with a trip limit of 1,800 kg (4,000 lb), an increase over past years in which the quota has ranged from 2 to 9 million kilograms (5 to 20 million lb), with trip limits from 900 to 1,400 kg (2,000 to 3,000 lb). In 2010, NOAA announced the Eastern US Atlantic spiny dogfish stocks to be rebuilt, and in 2011, concerns about dogfish posing a serious predatory threat to other stocks resulted in an emergency amendment of the quota with nearly 6.8 million kilograms (15 million lb) being added.

In June 2018, the New Zealand Department of Conservation classified Squalus acanthias Linnaeus as "Not Threatened" with the qualifier "Secure Overseas" under the New Zealand Threat Classification System.

In 2023, populations in EU and UK waters were determined to have recovered enough that they could be commercially fished.

== Fossil range ==
Squalus acanthias fossils are known from the Miocene of Denmark and the Netherlands, dating from approximately 11 million years ago. As with other cartilaginous fish, the fossil record of Squalus acanthias consists predominantly of dental material, as cartilage does not fossilize well. The teeth of S. acanthias can be hard to differentiate from those of other squaliforme sharks, making identification difficult.
