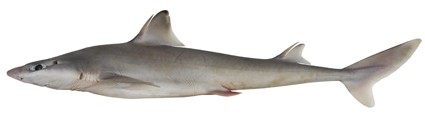

Conservation status
- Least Concern (IUCN 3.1)

Scientific classification
- Kingdom: Animalia
- Phylum: Chordata
- Class: Chondrichthyes
- Subclass: Elasmobranchii
- Division: Selachii
- Order: Squaliformes
- Family: Squalidae
- Genus: Squalus
- Species: S. crassispinus

Binomial name
- Squalus crassispinus Last, Edmunds & Yearsley, 2007

= Squalus crassispinus =

Species of shark

Squalus crassispinus, the fatspine spurdog, is a dogfish of the family Squalidae, found on the continental shelf off the northern coast of Western Australia, at depths of 180 to 200 metres (590 to 660 ft). The length of the longest male specimen measured is 56 centimetres (22 in).

Squalus crassispinus is a rare, small and slender dogfish with a broad head and short snout. There is a broad, small medial barbel on the anterior nasal flaps. The pectoral fin has a shallowly concave posterior margin. The first dorsal fin is moderately high, and both dorsal fin spines are very stout.

Coloration is light grey above, paler below, with no white spots. The pale dorsal fins have dusky tips.

Its reproduction is ovoviviparous.
