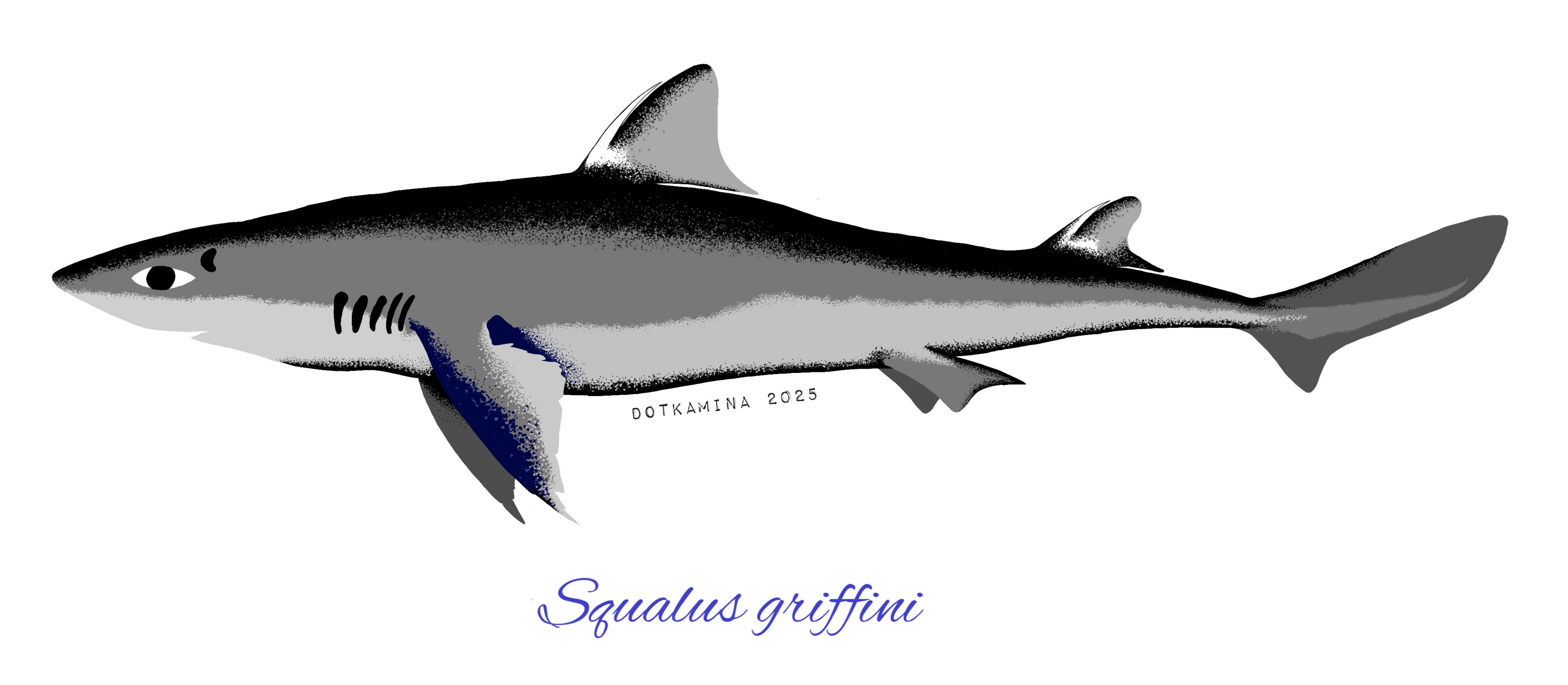

Conservation status
- Least Concern (IUCN 3.1)

Scientific classification
- Kingdom: Animalia
- Phylum: Chordata
- Class: Chondrichthyes
- Subclass: Elasmobranchii
- Division: Selachii
- Order: Squaliformes
- Family: Squalidae
- Genus: Squalus
- Species: S. griffini

Binomial name
- Squalus griffini Phillipps, 1931

= Northern spiny dogfish =

Species of shark

The northern spiny dogfish (Squalus griffini), also known as the brown dogfish, grey spiny dogfish or Griffin's dogfish, is a marine species of the family Squalidae, found off New Zealand's North Island. The length of the longest specimen measured is 89.9 cm (35.4 in).

In June 2018 the New Zealand Department of Conservation classified the northern spiny dogfish as "Not Threatened" with the qualifier "Secure Overseas" under the New Zealand Threat Classification System.
