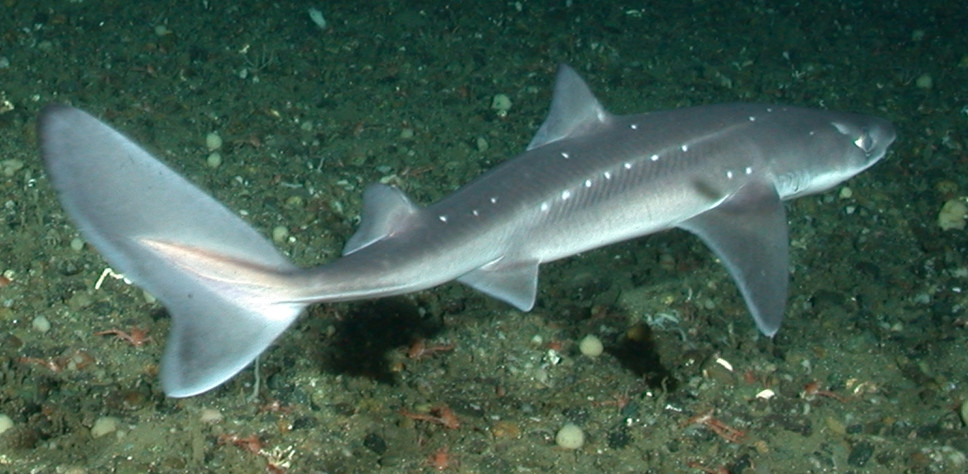

Conservation status
- Least Concern (IUCN 3.1)

- Secure (NatureServe)

Scientific classification
- Kingdom: Animalia
- Phylum: Chordata
- Class: Chondrichthyes
- Subclass: Elasmobranchii
- Division: Selachii
- Order: Squaliformes
- Family: Squalidae
- Genus: Squalus
- Species: S. suckleyi

Binomial name
- Squalus suckleyi Girard, 1854
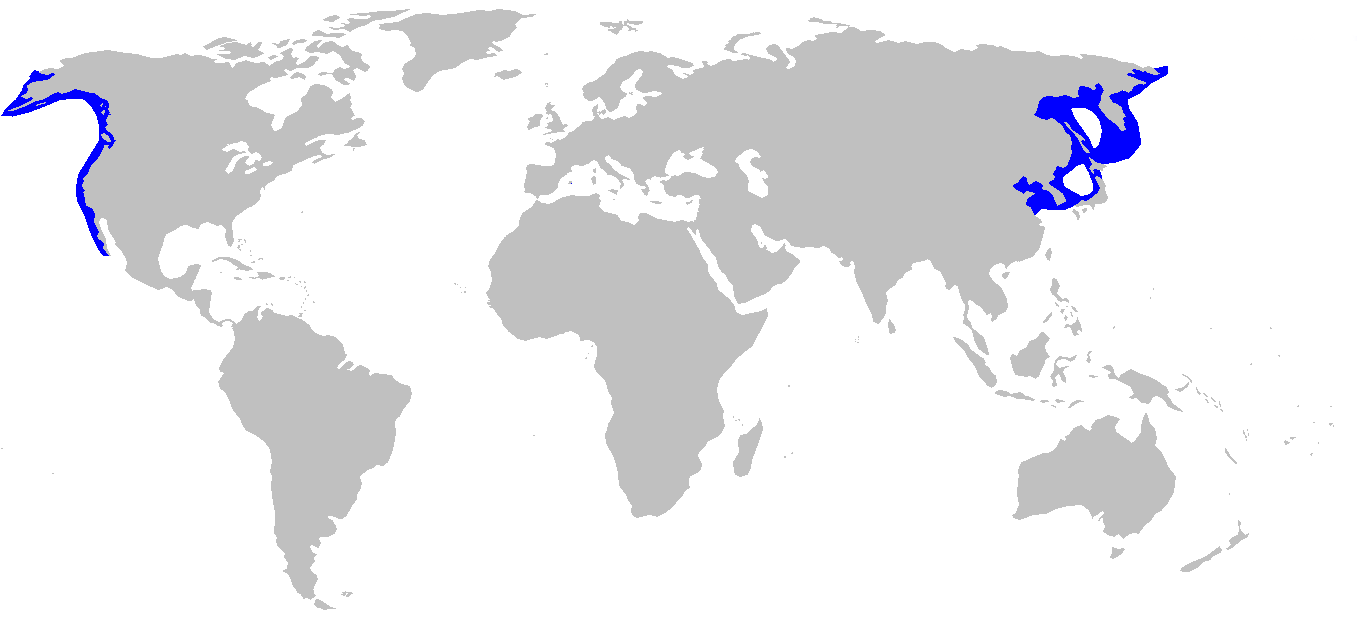
- Locations of Squalus suckleyi in the Pacific.

= Pacific spiny dogfish =

Species of shark

The Pacific spiny dogfish (Squalus suckleyi) is a common species of the Squalidae (dogfish) family of sharks and are among the most abundant species of sharks in the world. This species is closely related to the Spiny dogfish and for many years they were treated as a single species. Recent research, using meristic, morphological and molecular data led to the resurrection of the Pacific spiny dogfish as a separate species. The American Fisheries Society recommends the common name "Pacific spiny dogfish" for Squalus suckleyi over alternatives such as "spotted spiny dogfish" and "North Pacific spiny dogfish" and "spiny dogfish" for Squalus acanthias.

The maximum length of a Pacific dogfish can be 160 centimetres (63 in), and they can live up to 100 years. Squalus suckleyi has a slower growth rate, larger maximum size, and later maturity compared to Squalus acanthias species. The slower growth rate and time of maturity could be related to the colder temperatures these sharks face. Pacific spiny dogfish prefer to be in temperatures ranging from 7 to 15 °C (45 to 59 °F). Dogfish are found all over the world, but the Pacific spiny dogfish are found mostly in the North Pacific Ocean. These areas range from Korea to Japan and Russia, as well as the gulf of Alaska down to Baja, California. They are known to be piscivores, eating other fish. Additionally, they are known to consume octopus, squid, and crustaceans.

Squalus suckleyi have a slow reproduction rate compared to other sharks, with their gestation period being roughly around two years. This makes the Pacific dogfish more vulnerable to threats since they take longer to reproduce.

== Anatomy ==
=== Size, growth, and age ===
The Pacific spiny dogfish are small and skinny members of the family Squalidae. Throughout the entire Pacific Ocean, male and female dogfish measure up to be around 1.3–1.6 metres (4.3–5.2 ft). Female Pacific dogfish reach a weight of 6.8–10 kilograms (15–22 lb) by maturity, while the males tend to be much smaller in weight. The average maturation of the sharks normally take up to around 25 years. They can even live to the age of 100 years old. This makes the Northeast Pacific spiny dogfish the longest living out of all dogfish.

=== Appearance ===
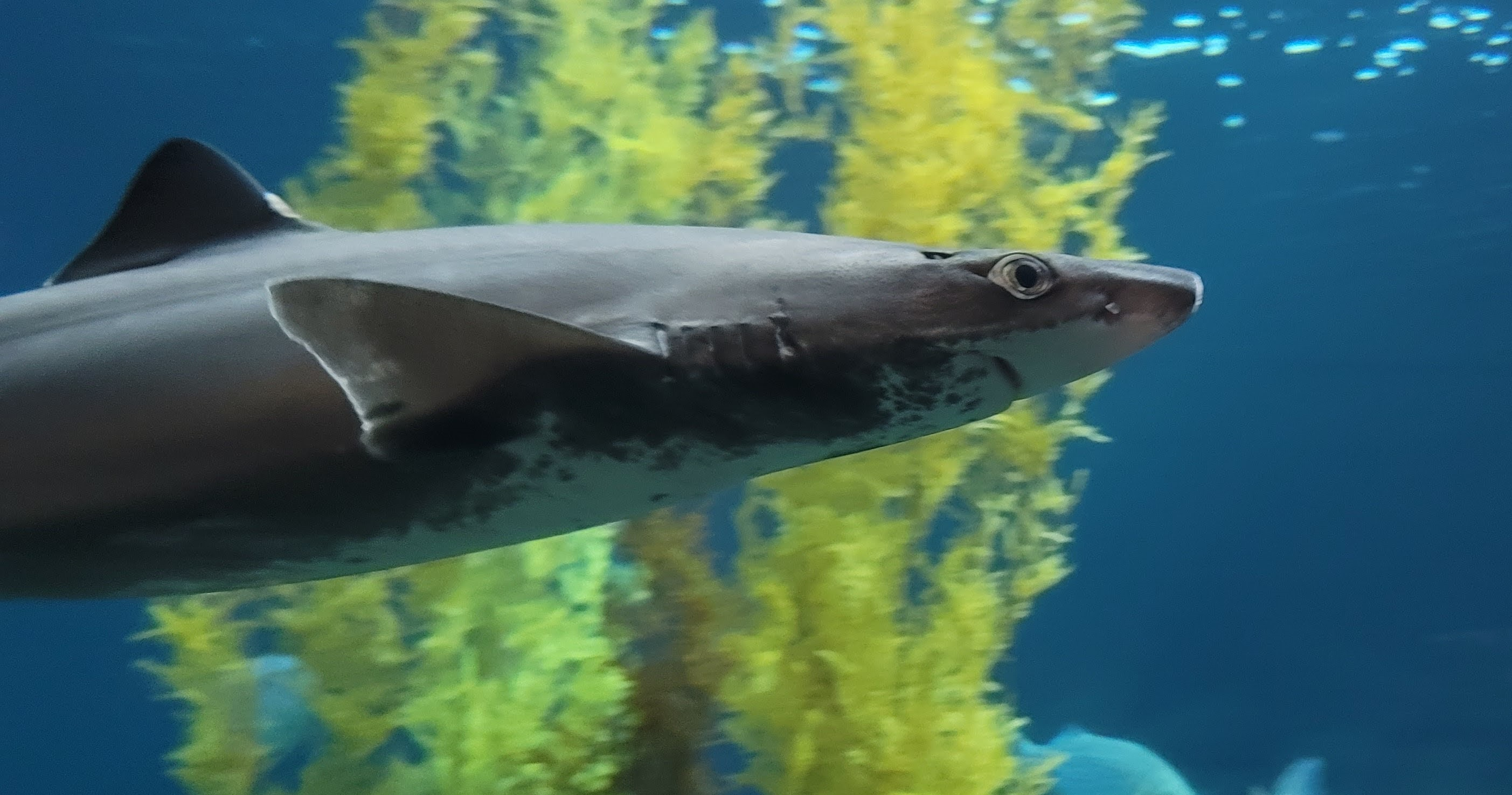
Closeup of a female at the Monterey Bay Aquarium

Its distinctive snout, large eyes, and flattened head are just a few of the physical characteristics that give the Pacific spiny dogfish its distinctive look. The dogfish has a cylindrical shaped body. This type of shark also contains a unique body coloring. The top half of the shark has a gray color with scattered white spots while the bottom half has a white/light gray color. The scales of the dogfish is composed of the same material of shark teeth called dermal denticles, making the skin very hard and durable. The skin of the sharks used to be used as sandpaper once dried to do woodwork or even be used as leather, once the denticles are removed. Lastly, the Pacific spiny dogfish has a set of teeth specialized for grinding instead of tearing by the teeth being flat with sharp edges. If any of the teeth are worn down or broken, new teeth replace them from the two rows that are not being used to prey on other animals.

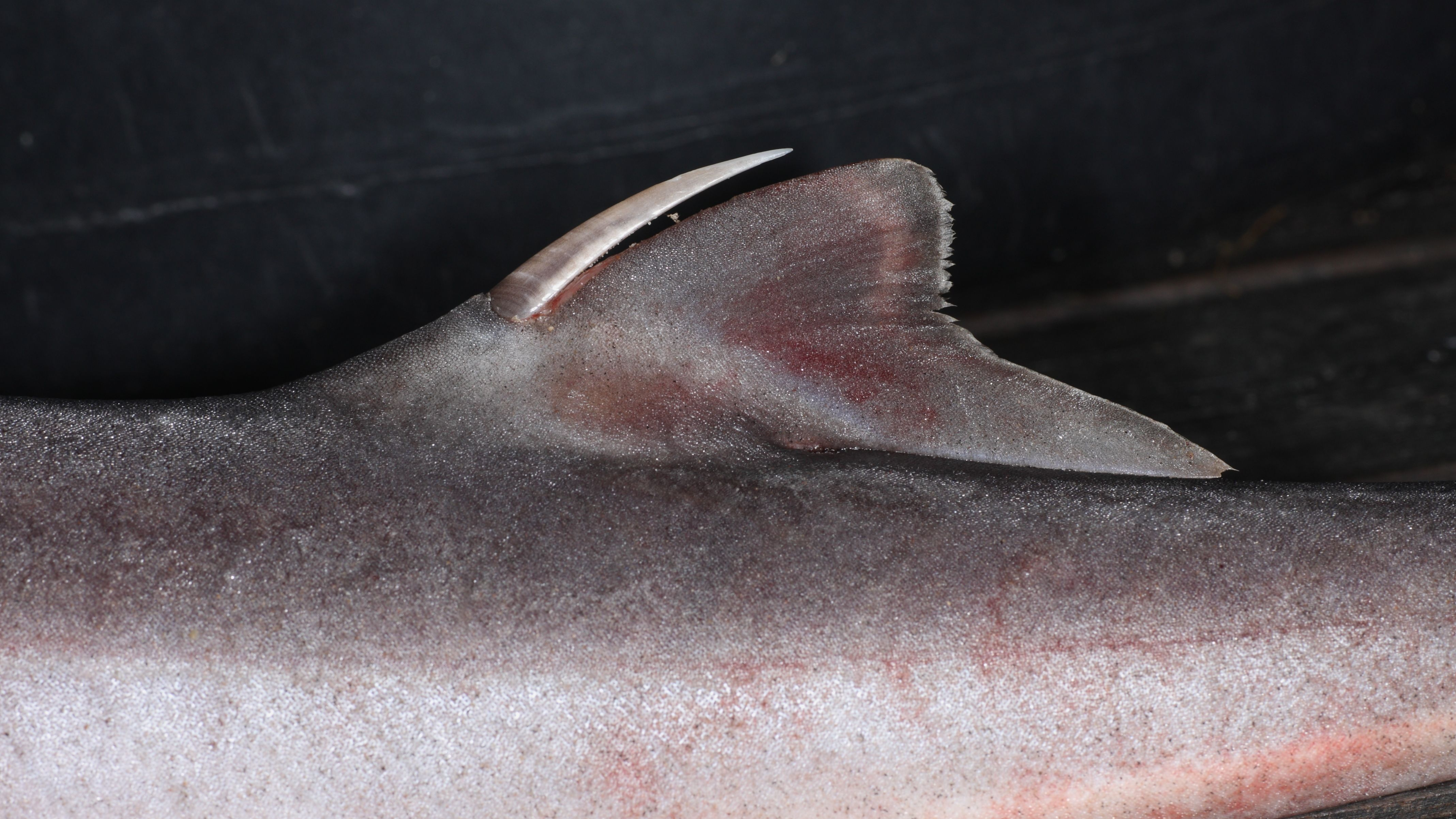
Pacific spiny dogfish's venomous fin

=== Spines and fins ===
Another specific characteristic of this type of shark is the structure of their fins. Although the Pacific spiny dogfish does not have an anal fin, they have a special fin instead. Relating to their name, the spiny dogfish have two spines that are in front of each dorsal fin. The use of two spines on the outer body have been proven for the use of protection against enemies such as other sharks, humans, and even whales. The two fins are known for their venomous nature, although the nature of the venom has not been well studied. This is where the name "spiny" comes into play due to the thornlike spines that are in front of each dorsal fin. The shark forms into a curled up ball and then attacks its predators. Another feature of the dorsal spines is annuli on the enamel that can be used to estimate age. The dorsal fins also give the shark advantages. The first dorsal fin helps the spiny dogfish maintain a stable body position while swimming while the second aids in generating thrust. The caudal fin is larger than normal, which helps the sharks maneuver through the water quickly and efficiently.

=== Gills ===
The Pacific spiny dogfish has a unique system of ventilation. This type of dogfish has five gills on each side of their heads, but do not have gill covers like bony fish. The shark is able to breathe with these gills by swimming or staying in a current. The Pacific spiny dogfish also has a special feature called a spiracle. These are gills that are behind the eyes of the shark that give oxygen to the eyes and brain. It is also used to breathe while resting or eating. The breathing of the dogfish happens as a two step process. First, the dogfish has water enter its mouth and exit through the parabranchial cavity, which then goes out through the five gill slits. The first three gill slits are primarily used for suction action. The fourth gill slit has the same purpose, but with a weaker activity. Finally, the fifth gill slit has water escaping while the Pacific spiny dogfish feeds on its prey.

== Habitat ==
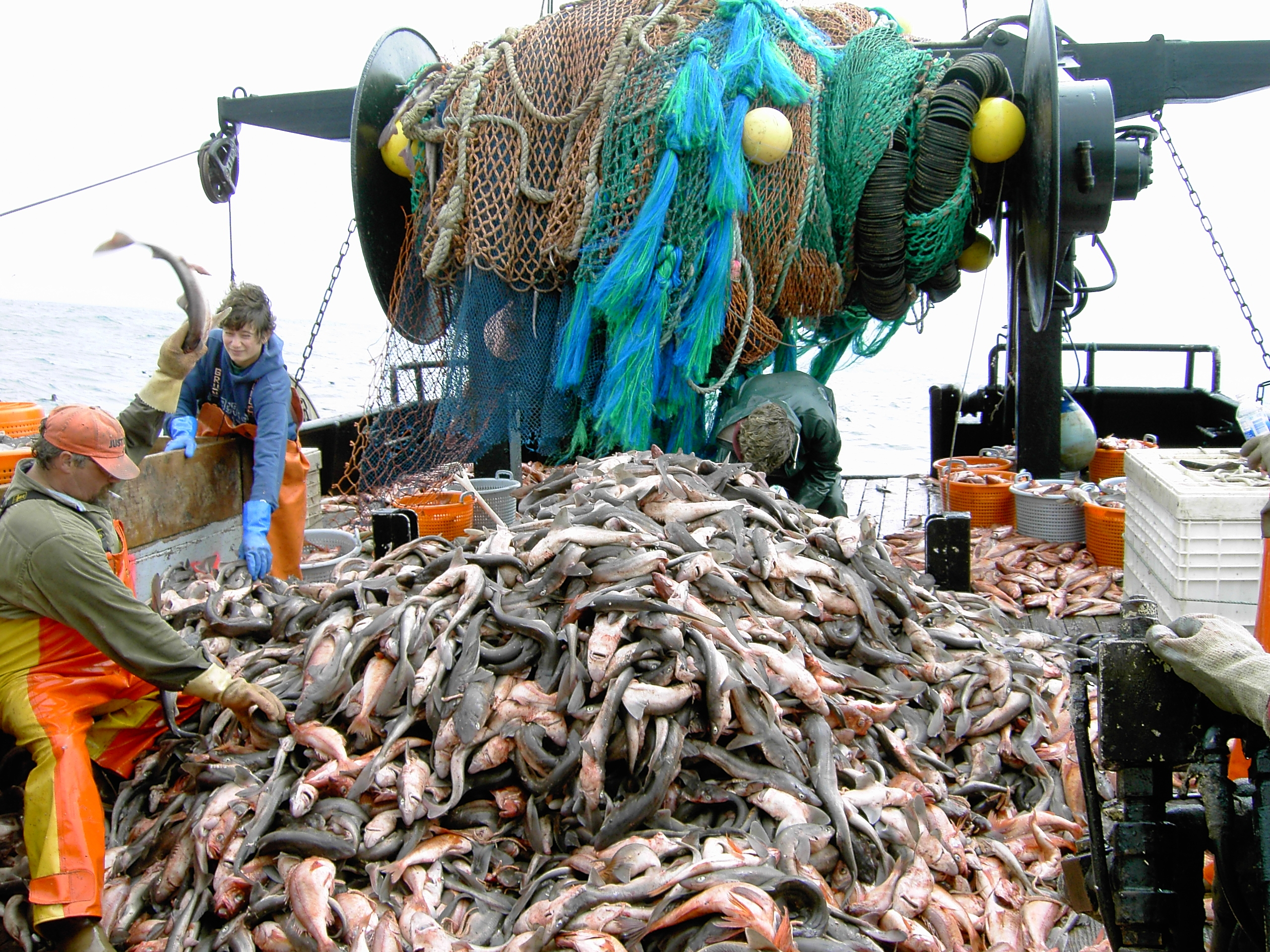
A large catch of Pacific spiny dogfish

=== Location ===
Dogfish in general live in three main areas of the ocean: the Pacific, Atlantic, and Indian ocean. While dogfish can be found all around the world, this specific type of spiny dogfish can be found in the Pacific Ocean. Spiny dogfish in the northern Pacific Ocean have recently been reevaluated and found to constitute a separate species, now known as the Pacific spiny dogfish.

=== Natural habitat ===
The Pacific dogfish's habitat consists of bays, including inshore and offshore waters. Female dogfish are usually seen in inshore waters while smalls pups are seen maneuvering in offshore waters. These animals are usually spotted at the bottom of the continental shelf at the bottom of the sea. The Pacific dogfish prefers to live mainly in saltwater, but they can live in and tolerate brackish water (a mix of salt and fresh water).

== Migration ==
Migratory patterns of Pacific spiny dogfish are not well understood. Analyses of tagged dogfish have shown a seasonal north-south migration along the west coast of the United States and Canada as well as a seasonal pattern of dogfish tagged in the inside waters of the Puget Sound repeatedly leaving that area for outside coastal waters in the summer.

Tagged dogfish released in Canadian waters off British Columbia were most often recaptured in the same area as released but 10 individuals were recaptured near Japan

Pacific spiny dogfish have been frequently captured over 1000 km from shore in salmon research gillnets in the North Pacific Ocean, suggesting that the trans-Pacific migrations from Canada to Japan could have passed through the open ocean rather than following the coast

== Reproduction ==
The Pacific dogfish have a longer reproduction rate compared to other sharks, but have the same reproduction characteristics as Squalus acanthias . The gestation period for spiny dogfish is normally 18 to 24 months. Dogfish that live in cooler water may have an increased duration of pregnancy. Females are also known to migrate from deep to shallow water as the pregnancy continues. This migration pattern is known to influence embryonic growth. Baby dogfish, also known as pups, found near Newfoundland had an average of 1.1 cm/month and 24 month pregnancy period, while a warmer area such as Massachusetts had an average of 1.3 cm/month and 20-22 month pregnancy period. The sexual maturity of a dogfish is hard to determine because it varies anywhere from 10–30 years. Food supplies and water temperature also play a role in growth and development of the dogfish. The length of a newborn Pacific dogfish is around 22 to 23 centimeters. Females seem to be significantly larger than male dogfish. At sexual maturity the male dogfish is 60–70 cm while the female is about 70–100 cm. This length difference can be caused by the reproduction process of the female. Their bodies need to be bigger to carry and protect their eggs within their bodies. Pacific dogfish are ovoviviparous. This means that they produce eggs that hatch within the body. The size of the litter ranges from 1 to 20 newborns. Fertilization usually occurs from the beginning of October to the beginning of February.

== Diet ==
The Pacific dogfish is an elasmobranchs or cartilaginous fish which includes sharks, skates and rays. Dogfish are carnivorous or meat eaters. Their teeth are sharp and are inclined laterally in order to cut through their prey. The Pacific dogfish usually eat mollusks or crustaceans such as squid, krill, and shrimp. They also eat other small sharks and fish. There is no difference between the diets of male and female dogfish. Their prey are usually found on the sea floor, so the Pacific spiny dogfish has to scan the bottom in order to invest in their prey. Elasmobranchs consume very little carbohydrates and glucose. During times of starvation, they rely on ketone bodies to give them enough energy to survive. Cartilaginous fish are able to endure severe hypoglycemia due to their ketone oxidation. Squalus suckleyi are able to eat more carbohydrates compared to other elasmobranchs. The rectal gland is activated when a dogfish consumes food. This gland helps the Pacific dogfish become glucose dependent. This means that they have the ability to break down a small amount of glucose.

== Threats ==
=== Threats to humans ===
The Pacific dogfish poses no immediate threat to humans. It is rare to hear about this type of shark attacking and injuring humans. The only significant way that the Pacific dogfish can cause harm to a human is if a person gets near the venomous spikes that are located at the dorsal fin.

=== Threats from other species ===
The main species of animals that threaten the Pacific dogfish population are sharks, Killer whales, seals, and larger bony fishes. The Pacific dogfish has relatively few predators, as its poisonous spines serve as a deterrent measure. The Giant Pacific Octopus has also been found to be a predator in the wild.

=== Human threats ===
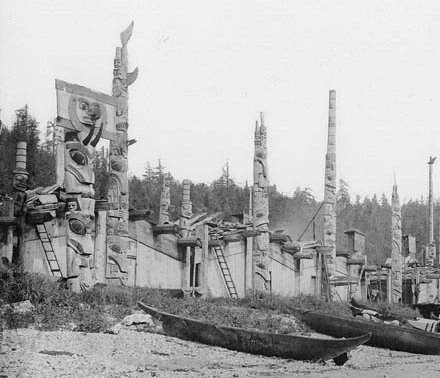
Haida totem poles including Pacific spiny dogfish totems in an 1878 photo taken in Skidegate, British Columbia, Canada

The slow growth and low reproductive rates of Pacific spiny dogfish make them vulnerable to overfishing, but unlike the spiny dogfish found in other regions, which has been declared overfished in the past, stock assessments for the Pacific spiny dogfish in Alaska, British Columbia, and the West Coast of the United States have either found that the data are not informative about the stock status, or that the stock is not overfished and that overfishing is not occurring.

For centuries, dogfish have been harvested on the Pacific coast for subsistence use and for their skin, which was used as a polishing material. Commercial fisheries first began targeting dogfish in the 1930s and commercial landings of Pacific spiny dogfish in the West Coast of the United States were highest in the 1940s, driven by a market for Vitamin A from shark liver oil. The mortality due to fishing was estimated to have peaked at over 15,000 mt in 1944 but rapidly declined in the years after that and remained below 3,000 mt for the years since 1950.

== Bibliography ==
- Atlantic States Marine Fisheries Commission. (n.d.). Retrieved November 16, 2017, from http://www.asmfc.org/species/spiny-dogfish
- Bigman, Jennifer S. (2013). Trophic ecology of North Pacific spiny dogfish (Squalus suckleyi) off central California waters (Thesis).
- Bigman, J.S., Ebert, D.A. & Goldman, K.J. 2016. Squalus suckleyi. The IUCN Red List of Threatened Species 2016: e.T195488A2382480. https://dx.doi.org/10.2305/IUCN.UK.2016-1.RLTS.T195488A2382480.en. Downloaded on 16 November 2017.
- Dogfish. (2017). Columbia Electronic Encyclopedia, 6th Edition, 1.
- Fisheries, N. (n.d.). Pacific Spiny Dogfish. Retrieved November 16, 2017, from https://www.fisheries.noaa.gov/species/pacific-spiny-dogfish
- Florida Museum. (n.d.). Retrieved November 16, 2017, from http://www.floridamuseum.ufl.edu./
- Fordham, S., Fowler, S.L., Coelho, R.P., Goldman, K. & Francis, M.P. 2016. Squalus acanthias. The IUCN Red List of Threatened Species 2016: e.T91209505A2898271. https://dx.doi.org/10.2305/IUCN.UK.2016-1.RLTS.T91209505A2898271.en. Downloaded on 16 November 2017.
- Jones, Thomas S.; Ugland, Karl I. (2001). "Reproduction of female spiny dogfish, Squalus acanthias, in the Oslofjord". Fishery Bulletin. 99 (4): 685–690. S2CID 86308174.
- Ketchen, K. S. (1 December 1972). "Size at Maturity, Fecundity, and Embryonic Growth of the Spiny Dogfish (Squalus acanthias) in British Columbia Waters". Journal of the Fisheries Research Board of Canada. 29 (12): 1717–1723. doi:10.1139/f72-272. ProQuest 17936290.
- Natanson, Lisa J.; McCandless, Camilla T.; James, Kelsey; Hoey, John (8 August 2017). "Gestation period and pupping seasonality of female spiny dogfish (Squalus acanthia) off southern New England". Fishery Bulletin. 115 (4): 473–483. doi:10.7755/FB.115.4.4. S2CID 36956091.
- Penaluna, Brooke E; Bodensteiner, Leo R (December 2015). "North Pacific Spiny Dogfish (Squalus suckleyi) Presence in Eelgrass Habitat in the Salish Sea, Washington". Northwestern Naturalist. 96 (3): 222–226. doi:10.1898/1051-1733-96.3.222. S2CID 87503274.
- Spiny Dogfish. (n.d.). Retrieved November 16, 2017, from http://www.edc.uri.edu/restoration/html/gallery/fish/dog.htm
- Taylor, Ian G.; Gertseva, Vladlena; Matson, Sean E. (October 2013). "Spine-based ageing methods in the spiny dogfish shark, Squalus suckleyi: How they measure up". Fisheries Research. 147: 83–92. Bibcode:2013FishR.147...83T. doi:10.1016/j.fishres.2013.04.011.
- Massie, Frederick D. (1998). The Uncommon Guide to Common Life of Narragansett Bay. Save The Bay, Incorporated. ISBN 978-0-9678977-0-7.
- "Spiny Dogfish". Environmental Data Center, University of Rhode Island. Archived from the original on 2017-09-10.
