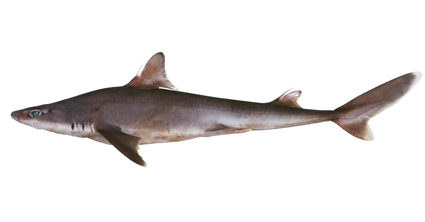

Conservation status
- Least Concern (IUCN 3.1)

Scientific classification
- Kingdom: Animalia
- Phylum: Chordata
- Class: Chondrichthyes
- Subclass: Elasmobranchii
- Division: Selachii
- Order: Squaliformes
- Family: Squalidae
- Genus: Squalus
- Species: S. albifrons

Binomial name
- Squalus albifrons Last, W. T. White & Stevens, 2007

= Squalus albifrons =

Species of shark

Squalus albifrons, the eastern highfin spurdog, is a dogfish described in 2007. It is a member of the family Squalidae, found on the continental shelf off Queensland, Australia, at depths between 220 and 510 m. The length of the longest specimen measured is 65 cm (26 in). Its reproduction is ovoviviparous.
