= Atlantic lobefin dogfish =

Conservation status
- Data Deficient (IUCN 3.1)

Scientific classification
- Kingdom: Animalia
- Phylum: Chordata
- Class: Chondrichthyes
- Subclass: Elasmobranchii
- Division: Selachii
- Order: Squaliformes
- Family: Squalidae
- Genus: Squalus
- Species: S. lobularis

Binomial name
- Squalus lobularis Viana, Carvalho & Gomes, 2016

Species of shark

The Atlantic lobefin dogfish (Squalus lobularis) is a dogfish described in 2016. It is a member of the family Squalidae, found off the coast of Brazil to Argentina. The length of the longest specimen measured is 64.0 cm (25.2 in).
