= Northeastern Brazilian dogfish =

Scientific classification
- Kingdom: Animalia
- Phylum: Chordata
- Class: Chondrichthyes
- Subclass: Elasmobranchii
- Division: Selachii
- Order: Squaliformes
- Family: Squalidae
- Genus: Squalus
- Species: S. bahiensis

Binomial name
- Squalus bahiensis Viana, Carvalho, & Gomes, 2016

Species of shark

The northeastern Brazilian dogfish (Squalus bahiensis) is a species of dogfish that was scientifically described in 2016. It is a member of the family Squalidae and is found off the coast of Brazil. The longest recorded specimen reaches 69.0 cm (27.2 in) in length.
