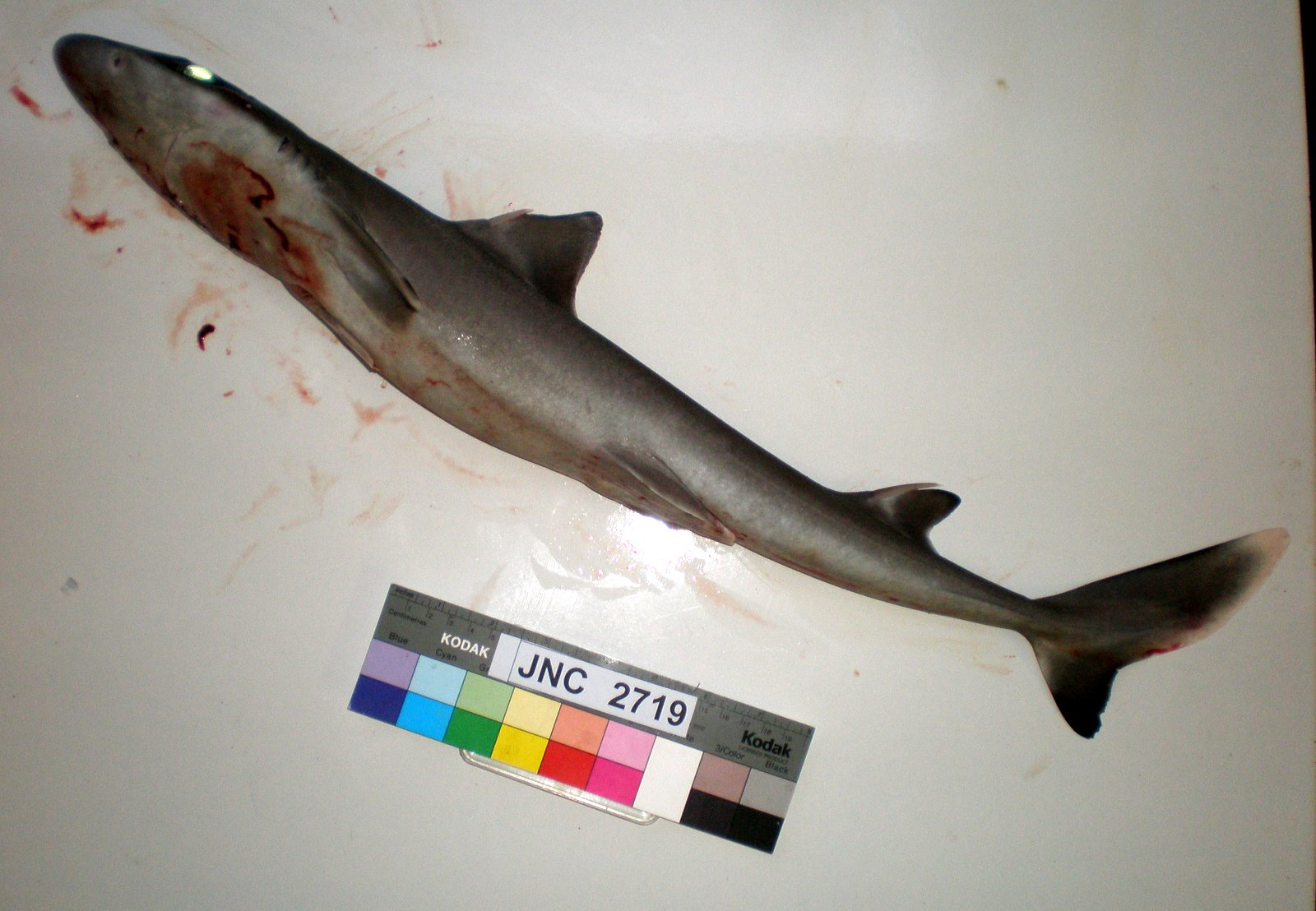
- from New Caledonia

Conservation status
- Data Deficient (IUCN 3.1)

Scientific classification
- Kingdom: Animalia
- Phylum: Chordata
- Class: Chondrichthyes
- Subclass: Elasmobranchii
- Division: Selachii
- Order: Squaliformes
- Family: Squalidae
- Genus: Squalus
- Species: S. melanurus

Binomial name
- Squalus melanurus Fourmanoir & Rivaton, 1979
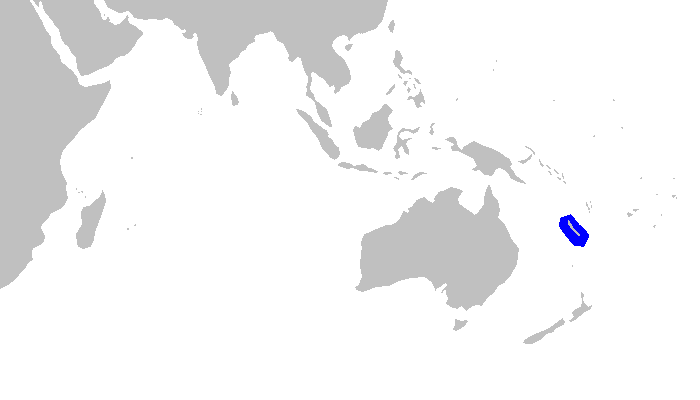
- Range of the blacktailed spurdog (in blue)

= Blacktailed spurdog =

Species of shark

The blacktailed spurdog (Squalus melanurus) is a dogfish, a member of the family Squalidae, found around New Caledonia in the central Pacific Ocean, at depths from 320 to 320 m. Its length is up to 75 cm.

Its reproduction is ovoviviparous.

== Parasites ==
The blacktailed spurdog has been seldom studied for parasites. The 1 mm-long monogenean Triloculotrema chisholmae has been described in 2009 from three specimens found in the nasal tissue of a single shark caught off New Caledonia. T. chisholmae was the second species described in the genus Triloculotrema Kearn, 1993 (family Monocotylidae). Species of Triloculotrema appear to be limited to deep-sea sharks, either triakids or squalids (possibly etmopterids).
The blacktailed spurdog is also the host of external parasites such as the aegid isopod Aega angustata on the skin. Internal parasites include several trypanorhynch cestodes in the spiral intestine, such as Vittirhynchus squali and Gilquinia sp.

== Gallery ==
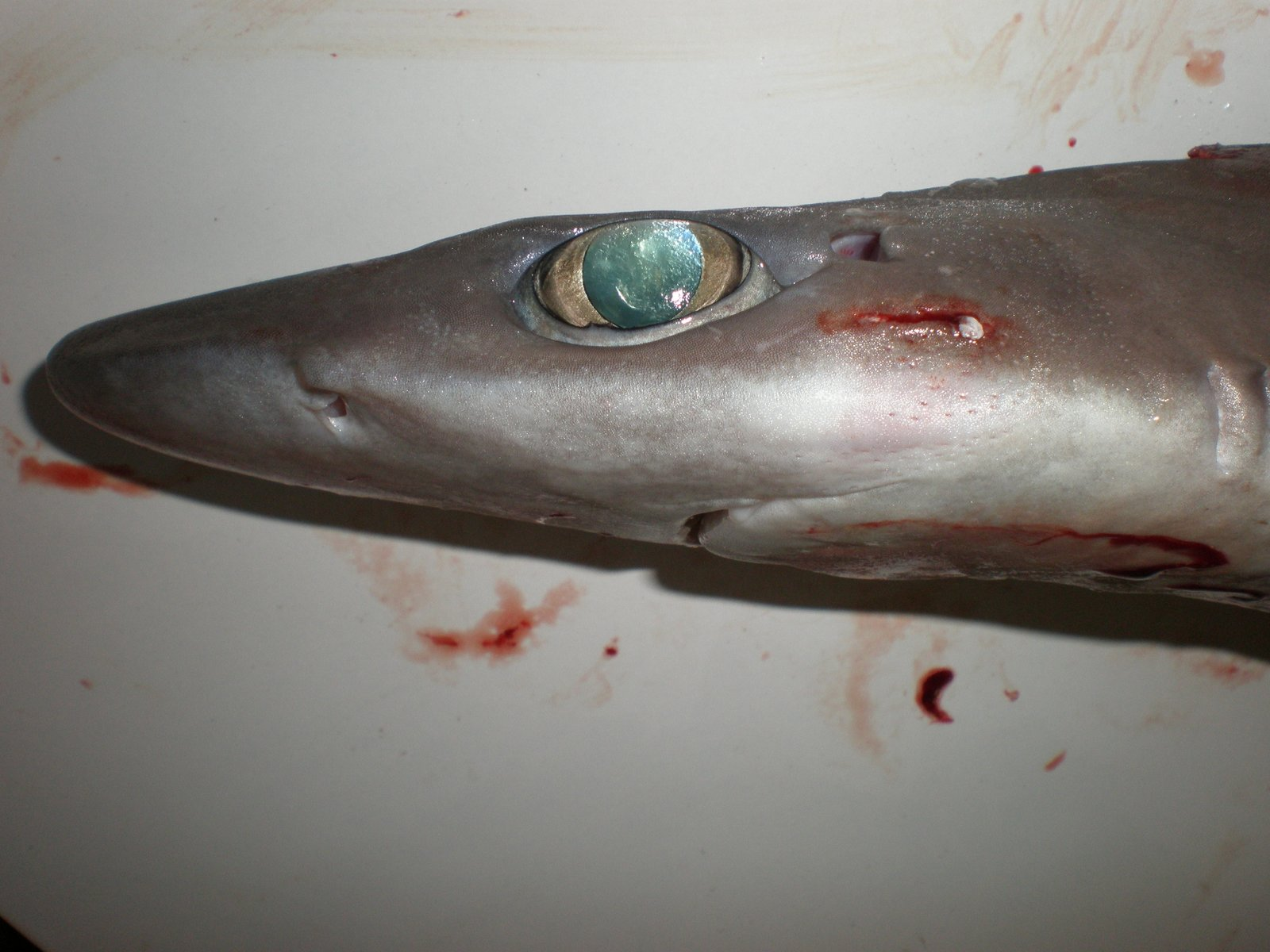
Squalus melanurus, head

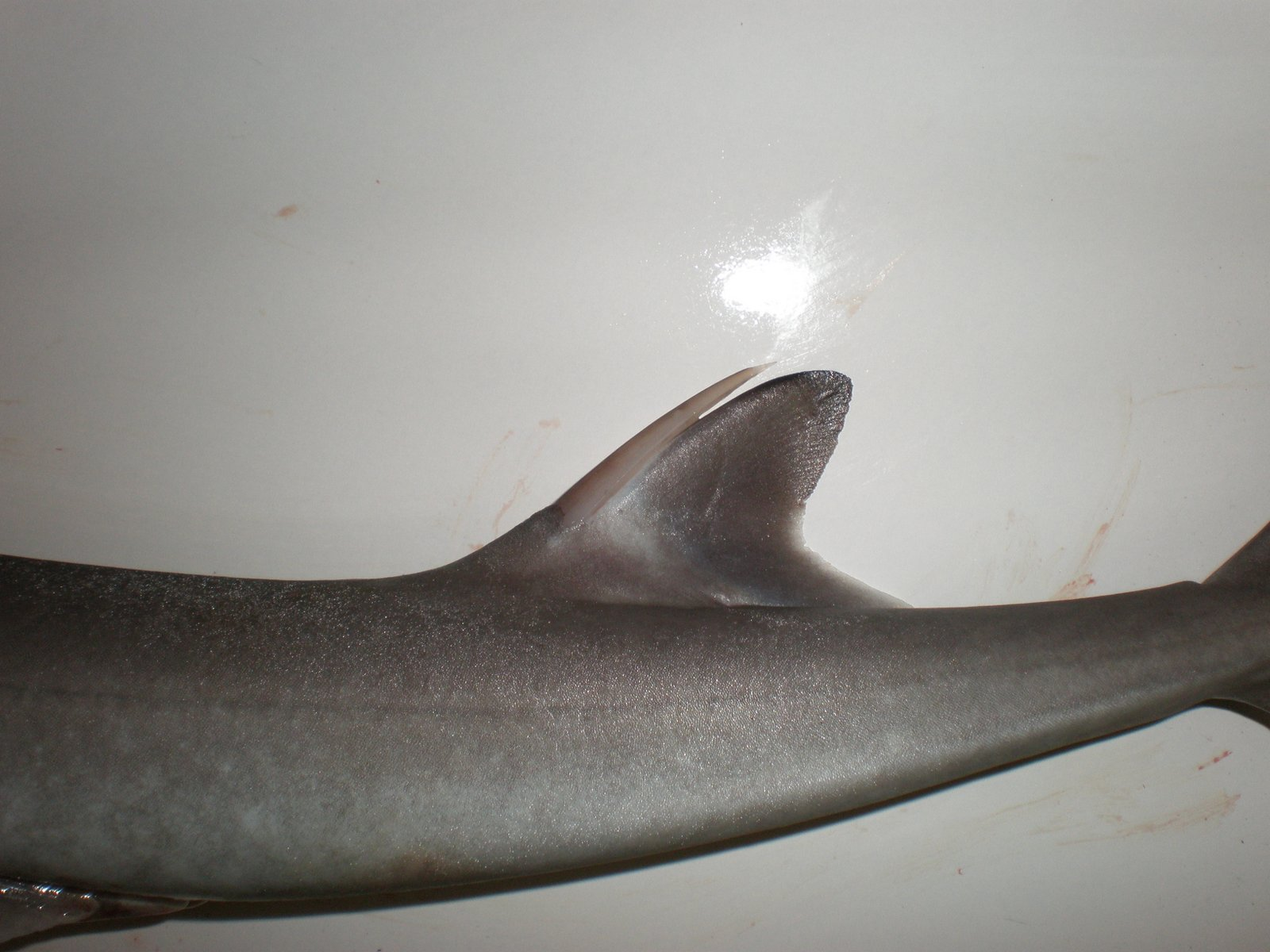
Squalus melanurus, dorsal fin and spine

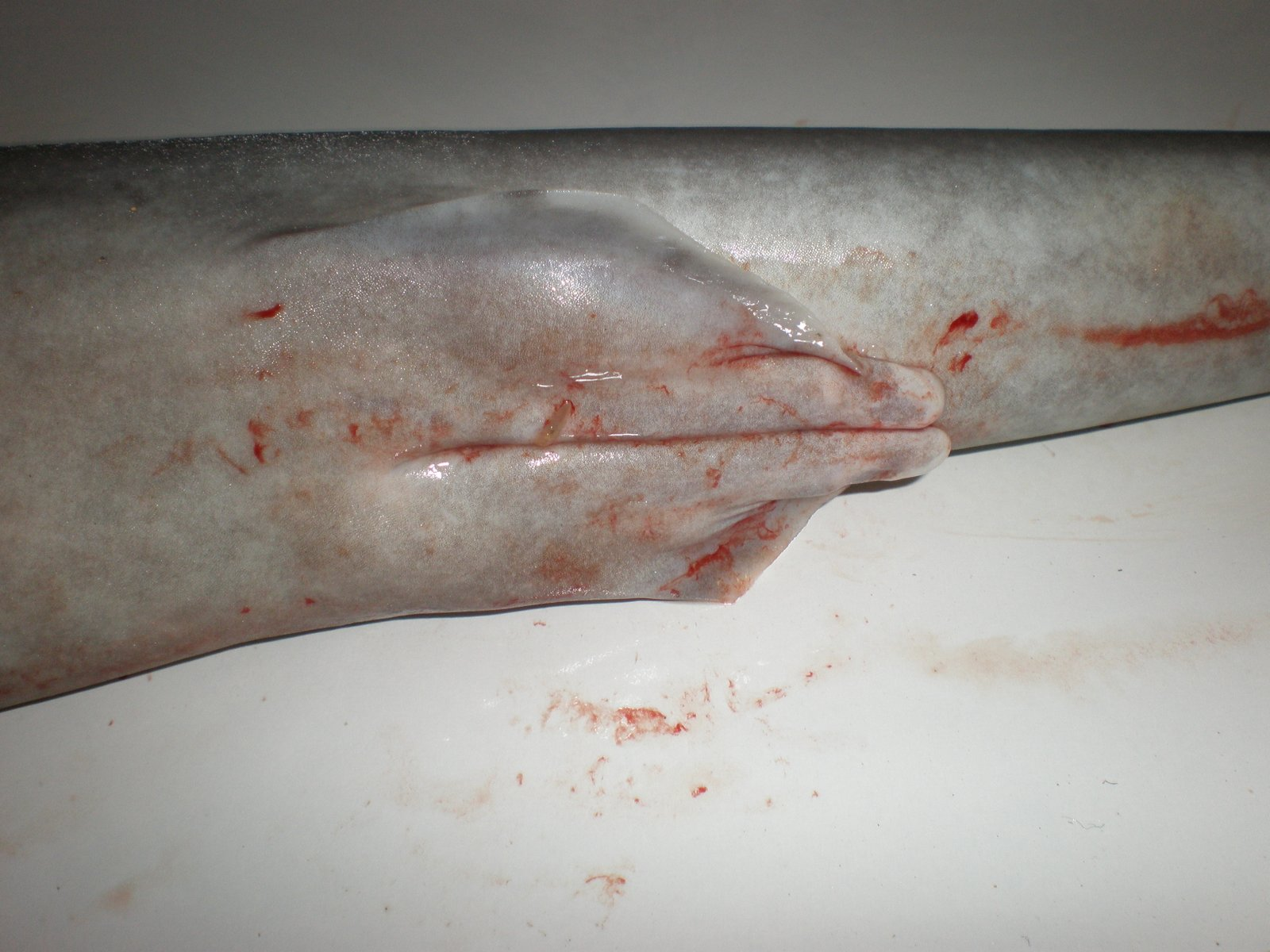
Squalus melanurus, ventral view of male
