= Humpback western dogfish =

Conservation status
- Data Deficient (IUCN 3.1)

Scientific classification
- Kingdom: Animalia
- Phylum: Chordata
- Class: Chondrichthyes
- Subclass: Elasmobranchii
- Division: Selachii
- Order: Squaliformes
- Family: Squalidae
- Genus: Squalus
- Species: S. quasimodo

Binomial name
- Squalus quasimodo Viana, Carvalho & Gomes, 2016

Species of shark

The humpback western dogfish (Squalus quasimodo) is a dogfish described in 2016. It is a member of the family Squalidae, found off the coast of Brazil. The length of the longest specimen measured is 85.0 cm (33.5 in).This shark got its scientific name from the hump on its back like the fictitious hunchback of Notre Dame, Quasimodo.
