= Cyrano spurdog =

Conservation status
- Near Threatened (IUCN 3.1)

Scientific classification
- Kingdom: Animalia
- Phylum: Chordata
- Class: Chondrichthyes
- Subclass: Elasmobranchii
- Division: Selachii
- Order: Squaliformes
- Family: Squalidae
- Genus: Squalus
- Species: S. rancureli

Binomial name
- Squalus rancureli (Fourmanoir & Rivaton, 1979)
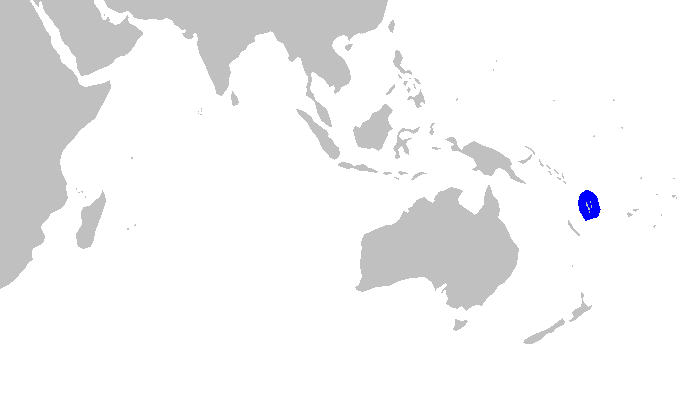
- Range of the cyrano spurdog (in blue)

Species of shark

The Cyrano spurdog (Squalus rancureli) is a dogfish, a member of the family Squalidae, found in the western central Pacific Ocean between latitudes 16°S and 18°S at depths between 320 and 400 m. Its length is up to 77 cm.

Its reproduction is ovoviviparous.
