= Brazilian whitetail dogfish =

Scientific classification
- Kingdom: Animalia
- Phylum: Chordata
- Class: Chondrichthyes
- Subclass: Elasmobranchii
- Division: Selachii
- Order: Squaliformes
- Family: Squalidae
- Genus: Squalus
- Species: S. albicaudus

Binomial name
- Squalus albicaudus Viana, Carvalho, & Gomes, 2016

Species of shark

The Brazilian whitetail dogfish (Squalus albicaudus) is a dogfish described in 2016. It is a member of the family Squalidae, found off the coast of Brazil, at depths between 195 – 421 meters. The length of the longest specimen measured is 52.5 cm (20.7 in).
