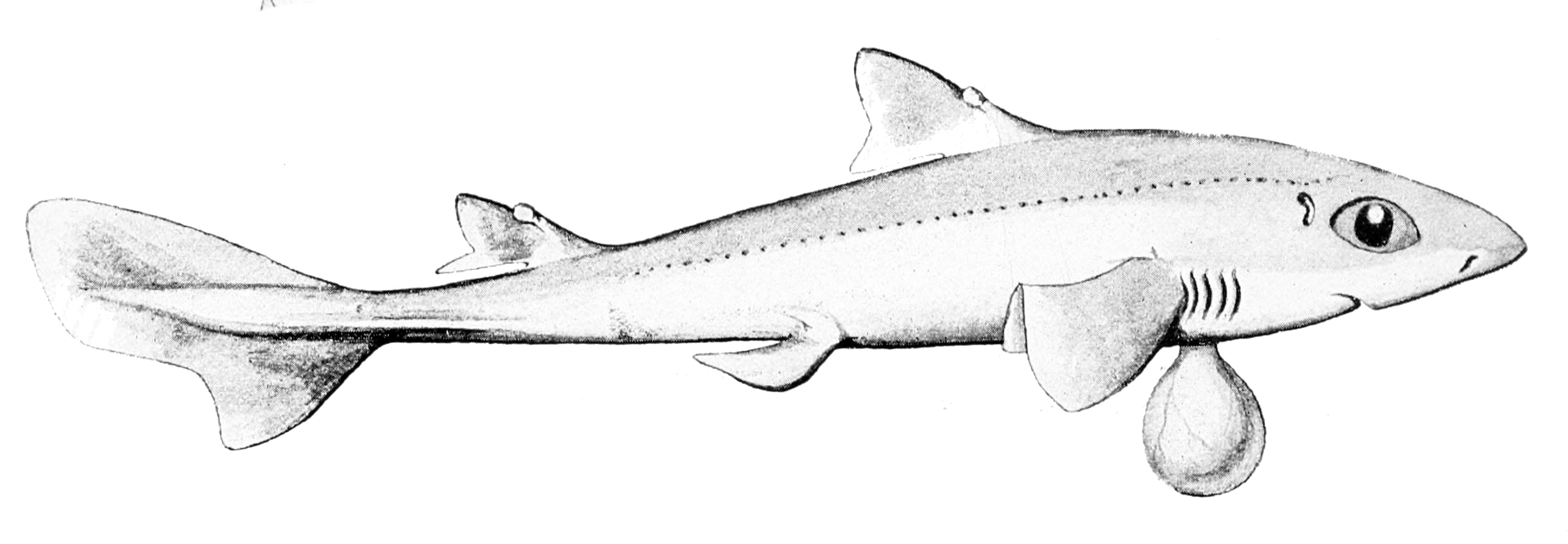

Conservation status
- Least Concern (IUCN 3.1)

Scientific classification
- Kingdom: Animalia
- Phylum: Chordata
- Class: Chondrichthyes
- Subclass: Elasmobranchii
- Division: Selachii
- Order: Squaliformes
- Family: Squalidae
- Genus: Squalus
- Species: S. megalops

Binomial name
- Squalus megalops (W. J. Macleay, 1881)
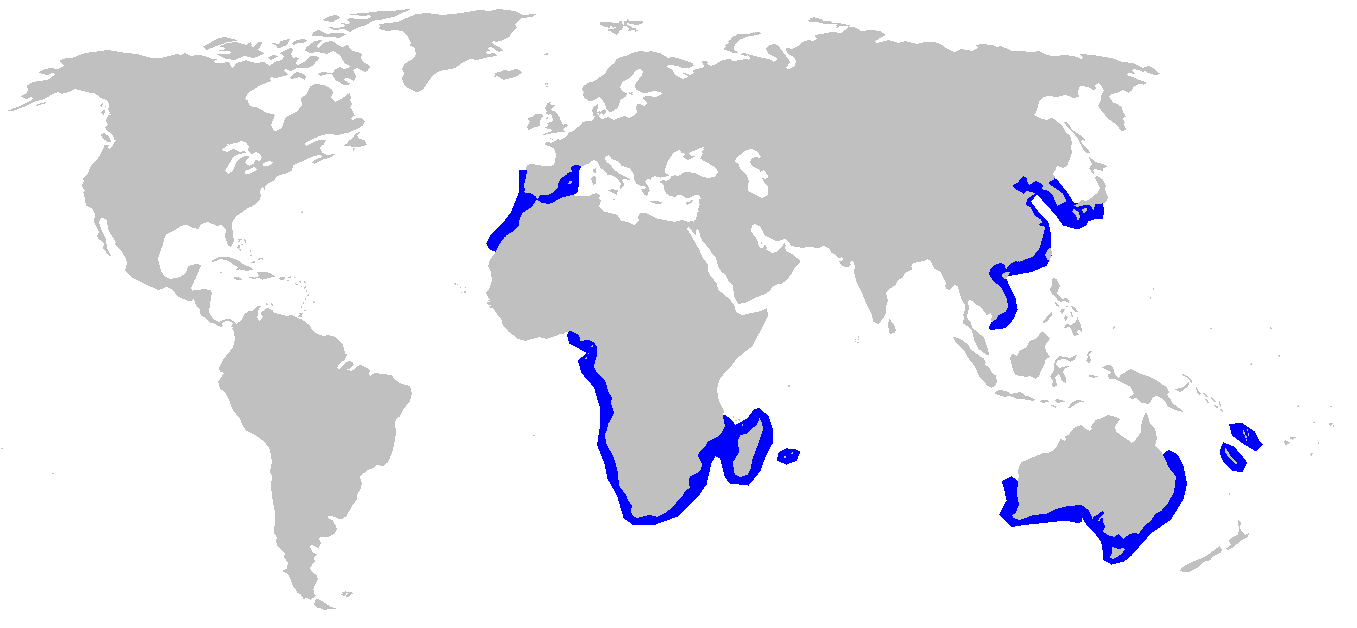
- Range of the shortnose spurdog (in blue)

= Shortnose spurdog =

Species of shark

The shortnose spurdog (Squalus megalops) also known as the piked spurdog is a small shark located primarily off the coast of Southern Australia and South Africa. The shortnose spurdog's size is dependent on the sex of the animal. The female shortnose spurdog is consistently larger than the male shortnose spurdog and will typically measure out to about 56.41 cm (1.85 ft) while the male shortnose spurdog will typically only measure out to about 44.36 cm in length (1.46 ft) which means the female shortnose spurdog is over 10 cm longer than the male shortnose spurdog. Some females can even measure up to 78 cm which is over 2.5 feet long. The life span of spurdog's can be quite long with females typically living longer than males. The average life span of a female shortnose spurdog is 0–29 years old while the male life span is 0–26 though it is estimated that a female can live up to 46 years while a male can only live up to 33. Females also take longer to reach sexual maturity than males and on average are not fertile until they are over 15 years of age. 7 years longer than the 8 years it takes males to reach maturity. The shortnose spurdog's eat a variety of items but primarily favor cephalopods such as squid and octopuses for their meals. Other organisms that have been found in their stomachs include fish, hermit crabs, sponges, brittle stars, the remains of sea lion and even primary producers such as algae.

== Habitat ==
The shortnose spurdog's primary populations are off the coasts of southern Africa and Australia. It is possible that the shortnose spurdog may also live in the eastern Atlantic, southern Indian Ocean and western North Pacific but there has been no data to support these populations so far. It was recently confirmed however that there are shortnose spurdogs in the Mediterranean Sea.

== Reproduction ==
Shortnose spurdog carry their eggs in utero and typically carry their eggs for 2 years. Reproduction is perhaps the answer to why females are so much larger than males since larger female sharks are more likely to have a larger litter size. This is because larger females produce larger embryos that therefore have a higher survival rate. The average litter size is only 2–4 and only 50% of sexually mature females reach recruitment, meaning have offspring that will settle and grow into maturity and become part of the population. This means that a simple measurement of reproduction is not an accurate method at predicting the population of this creature that possesses such a large maturation cycle.

== Diet ==
Though sharks across separate ecosystems do favor similar diets despite their location, their diet diversity does slightly differ depending on the ecosystem. Specifically, shortnose spurdog sharks live off the east coast of Australia show an increased level in their diet diversity when compared to other population groups in Australia. Size also plays a role in diet. While larger, sexually mature sharks typically go after prize prey such as mollusks, smaller sharks rely more heavily on crustaceans. This is primarily because squids, octopuses and other mollusks on the menu for the shortnose spurdog are often free swimming and easier to catch. This makes it more difficult for smaller sharks to rely on them as a source of food. Instead the smaller shortnose spurdogs will rely on benthic prey since benthic prey live on the surface of the ocean floor.
