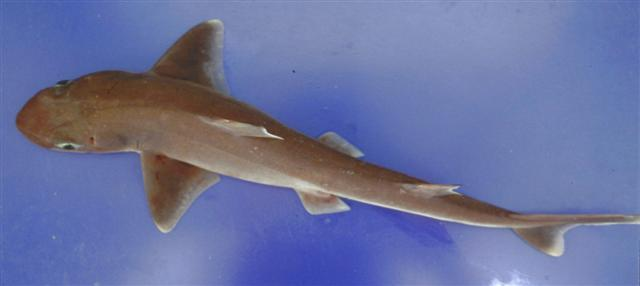

Conservation status
- Data Deficient (IUCN 3.1)

Scientific classification
- Kingdom: Animalia
- Phylum: Chordata
- Class: Chondrichthyes
- Subclass: Elasmobranchii
- Division: Selachii
- Order: Squaliformes
- Family: Squalidae
- Genus: Squalus
- Species: S. blainville

Binomial name
- Squalus blainville (A. Risso, 1827)
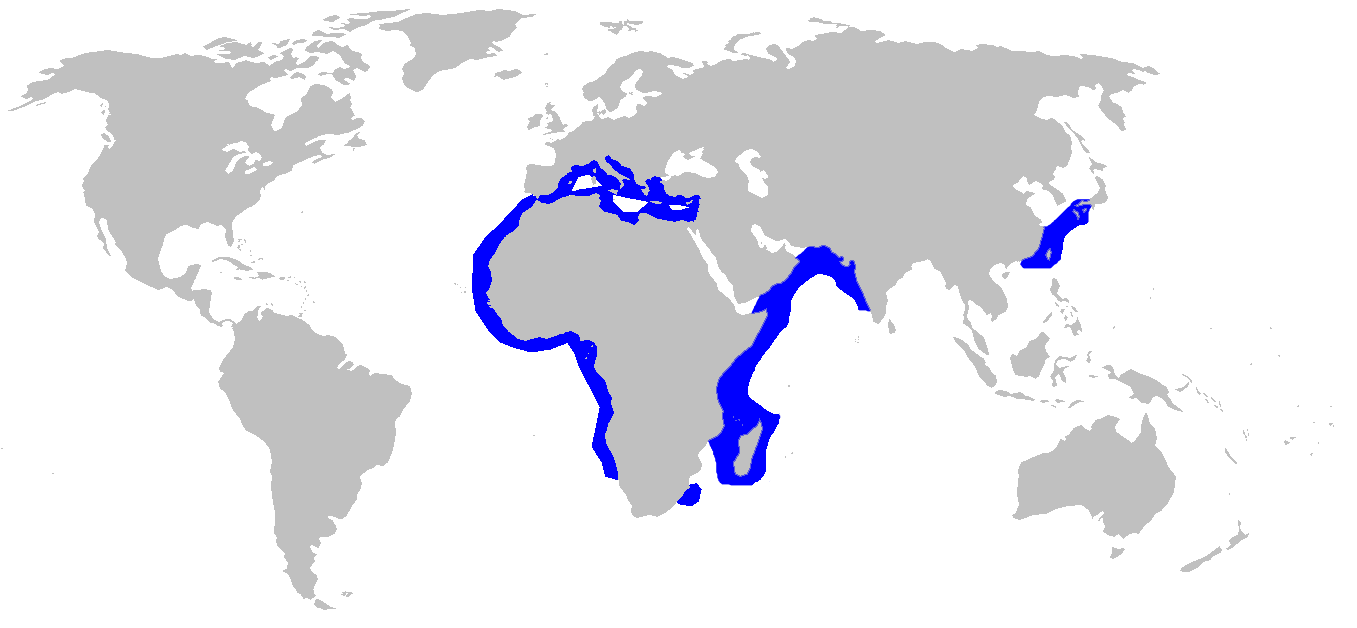
- Range of the longnose spurdog (in blue)

= Longnose spurdog =

Species of shark

The longnose spurdog (Squalus blainville) is a dogfish shark of the genus Squalus, found over continental shelves in all oceans, at depths of between 15 and 800 metres. They reach one metre in length.
