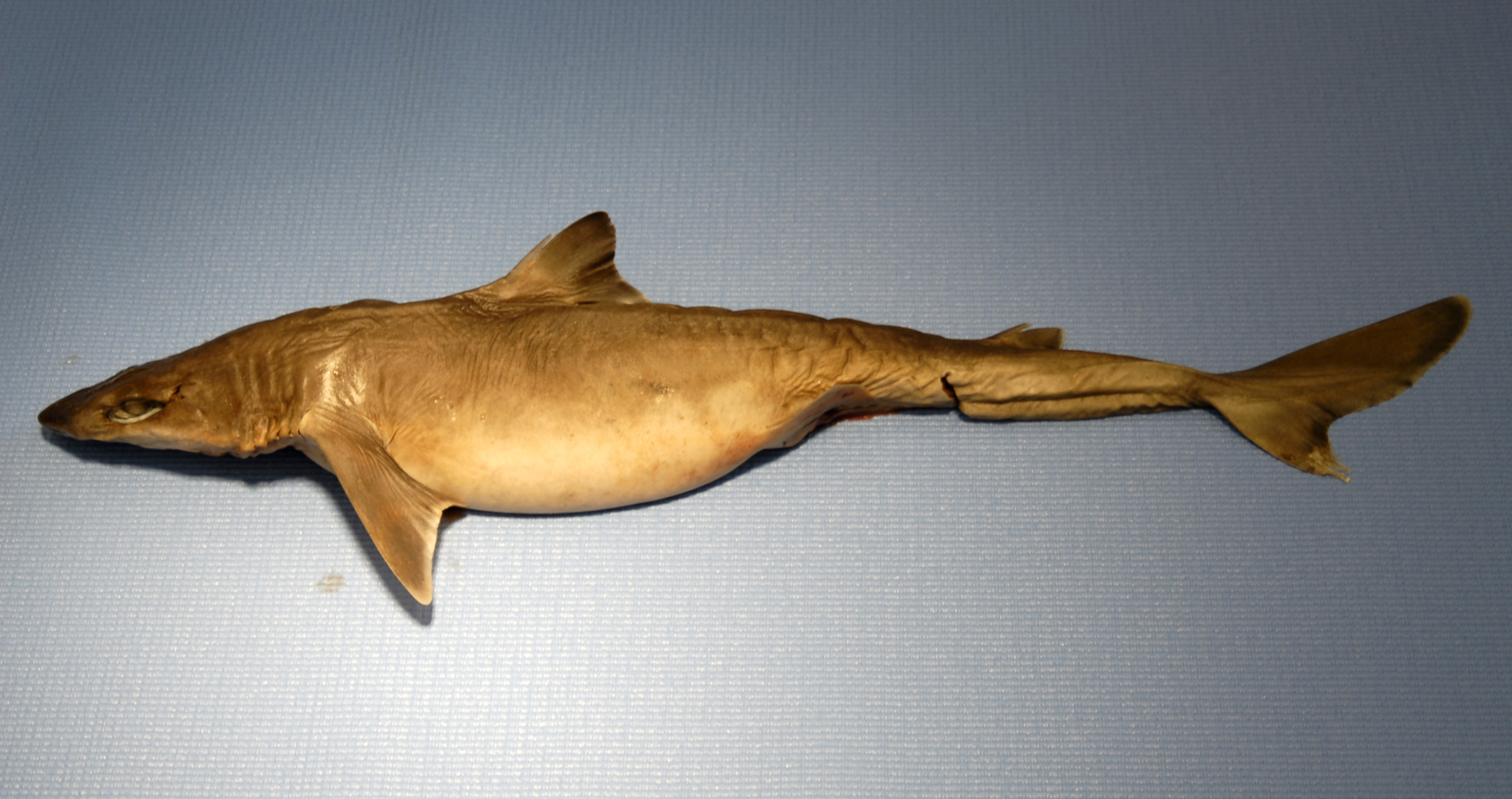

Conservation status
- Endangered (IUCN 3.1)

Scientific classification
- Kingdom: Animalia
- Phylum: Chordata
- Class: Chondrichthyes
- Subclass: Elasmobranchii
- Division: Selachii
- Order: Squaliformes
- Family: Squalidae
- Genus: Squalus
- Species: S. mitsukurii

Binomial name
- Squalus mitsukurii D. S. Jordan & Snyder, 1903
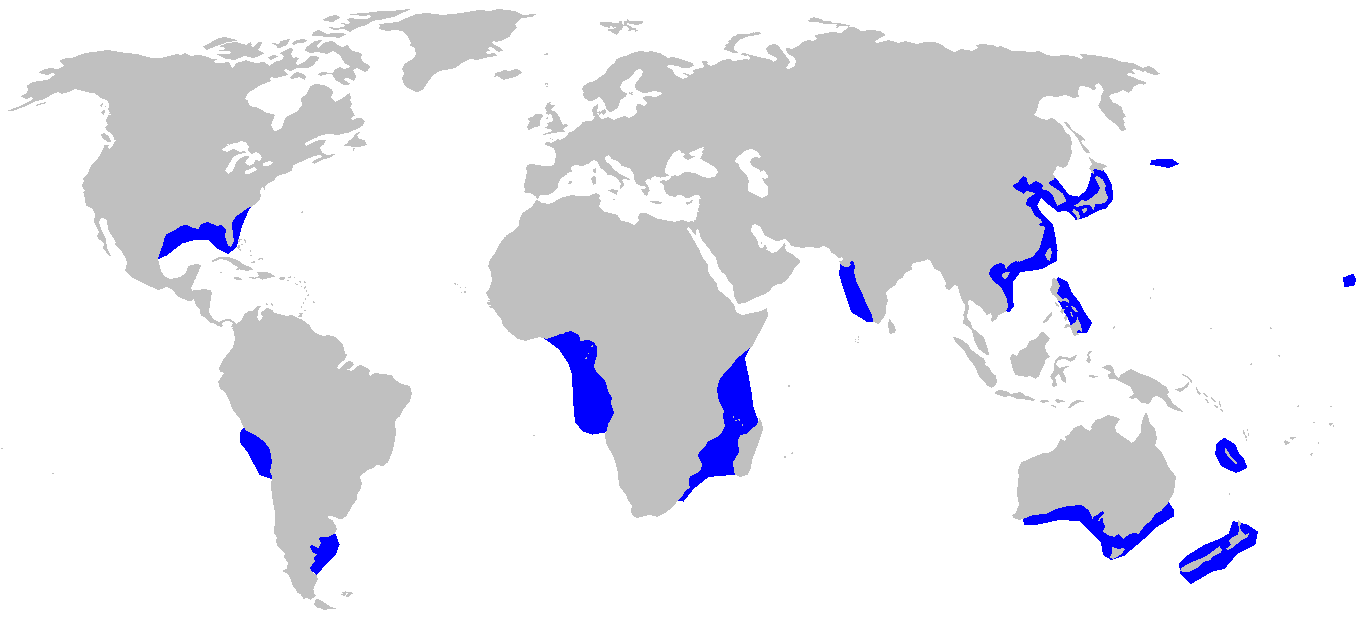
- Range of the shortspine spurdog

Synonyms
- Squalus acutirostris Chu, Meng & Li, 1984

= Shortspine spurdog =

Species of shark

The shortspine spurdog (Squalus mitsukurii) is a dogfish, a member of the family Squalidae, found on continental shelves off Japan in temperate waters, from the surface to 950 m. Its length is up to 75 cm.

== Taxonomy ==
The shortspine dogfish was once seen as a circumglobal species by many authors, including Compagno (1984) and Last & Stevens (1994). However, a series of papers published since 2007 have shown that a number of species synonymized with S. mitsukurii are distinct, and that the Hawaiian population of S. mitsukurii represent a distinct species, the Hawaiian spurdog.

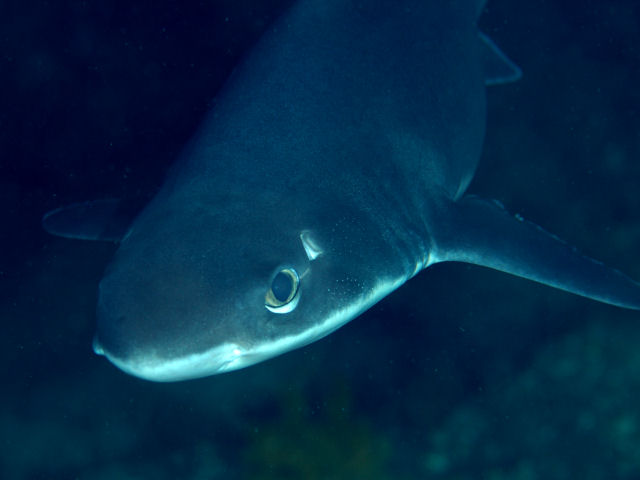
Head

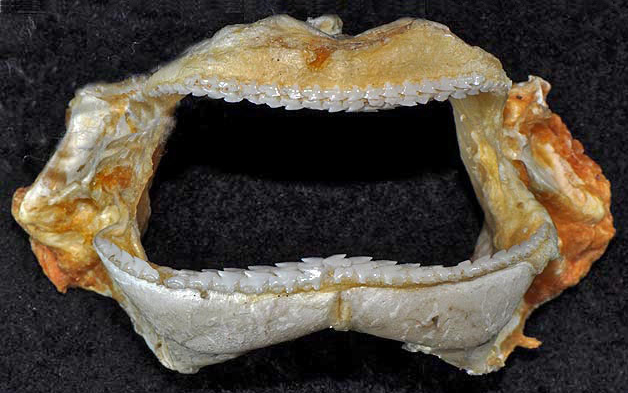
Jaws

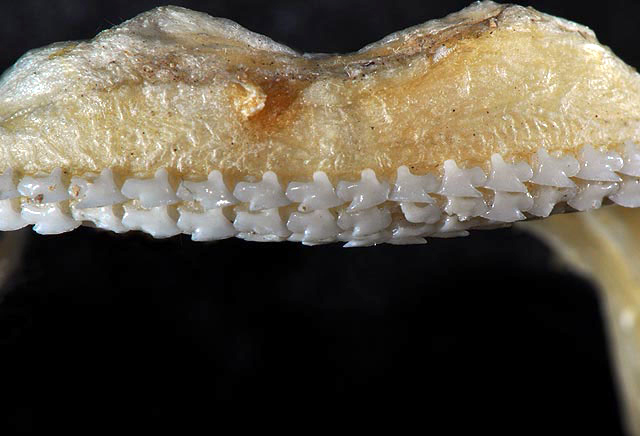
Upper teeth

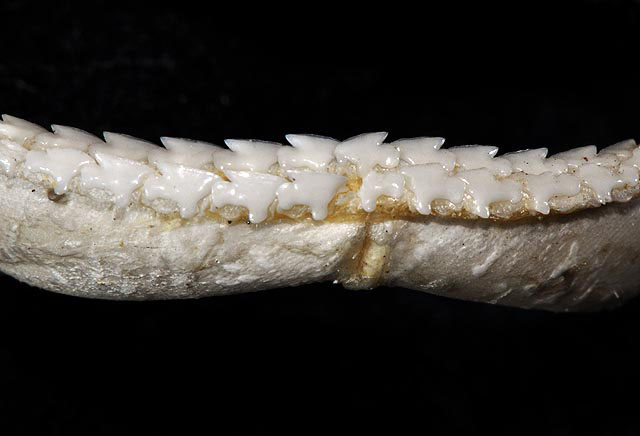
Lower teeth
