= William Toby White =

Australian ichthyologist

William Toby White is an Australian ichthyologist. He studies speciation and biodiversity of shark, ray, and skate species (subclass Elasmobranchii) through morphological and molecular systematics.

== Education ==
White received bachelor's (1997) and doctoral (2003) degrees in Biological Science from Murdoch University in Perth, Australia. His doctoral thesis, "Aspects of the biology of elasmobranchs in a subtropical embayment in Western Australia and of chondrichthyan fisheries in Indonesia", examined 1) spatial partitioning of food resources available to shark, ray, and skate species in Shark Bay (off the western coast of Australia), and 2) the relative frequencies of shark, ray, and skate species caught in fisheries off the coast of southeastern Indonesia. From 2004 to 2006 he did post-doctoral training, also at Murdoch University.

== Professional career ==
Since 2006, White has served as ichthyologist at the Australian National Fish Collection which is part of the CSIRO Marine and Atmospheric Research facility in Hobart, the capital of the Australian state of Tasmania. As of 2014, he has at least 137 publications, which have been cited at least 1767 times. He has described over 50 new sharks and rays, as well as 7 new bony fishes (teleosts) in publications which he authored or co-authored, including the discovery and naming of the shark species Squalus formosus. Another stated area of research interest is fishery management of developing countries, particularly in Papua New Guinea and the Indonesian archipelago. Since 2011, he has served as editor for the journal Ichthyological Research.

== See also ==
- Category:Taxa named by William Toby White
