= Southern dogfish =

Scientific classification
- Kingdom: Animalia
- Phylum: Chordata
- Class: Chondrichthyes
- Subclass: Elasmobranchii
- Division: Selachii
- Order: Squaliformes
- Family: Centrophoridae
- Genus: Centrophorus
- Species: C. zeehaani

Binomial name
- Centrophorus zeehaani W. T. White, Ebert & Compagno, 2008
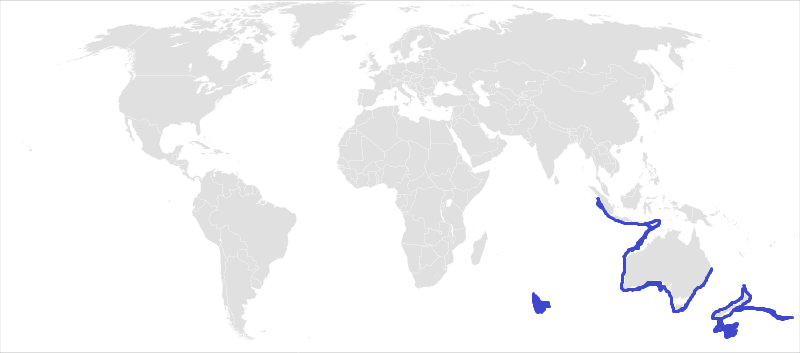
- Known range of the Southern dogfish (in blue)

Species of shark

The southern dogfish (Centrophorus zeehaani) is a species of shark in the family Centrophoridae. It was described in 2008 along with the western gulper shark, and belongs to genus Centrophorus. It is mainly found in the Indian and Pacific ocean, but they are distributed in other oceans as well. As a result, it is one of the more recent and elusive types of shark to date.
