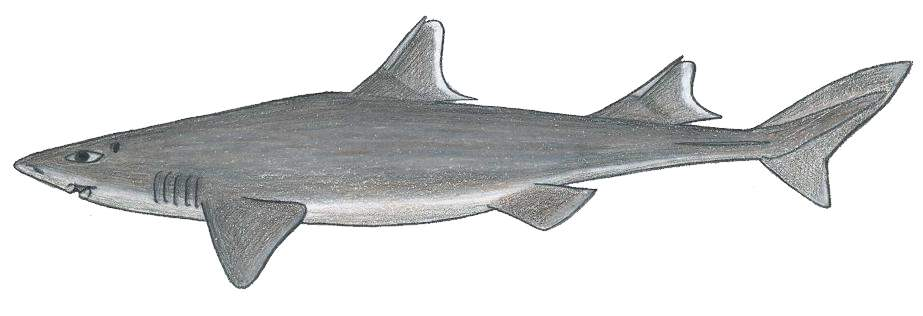

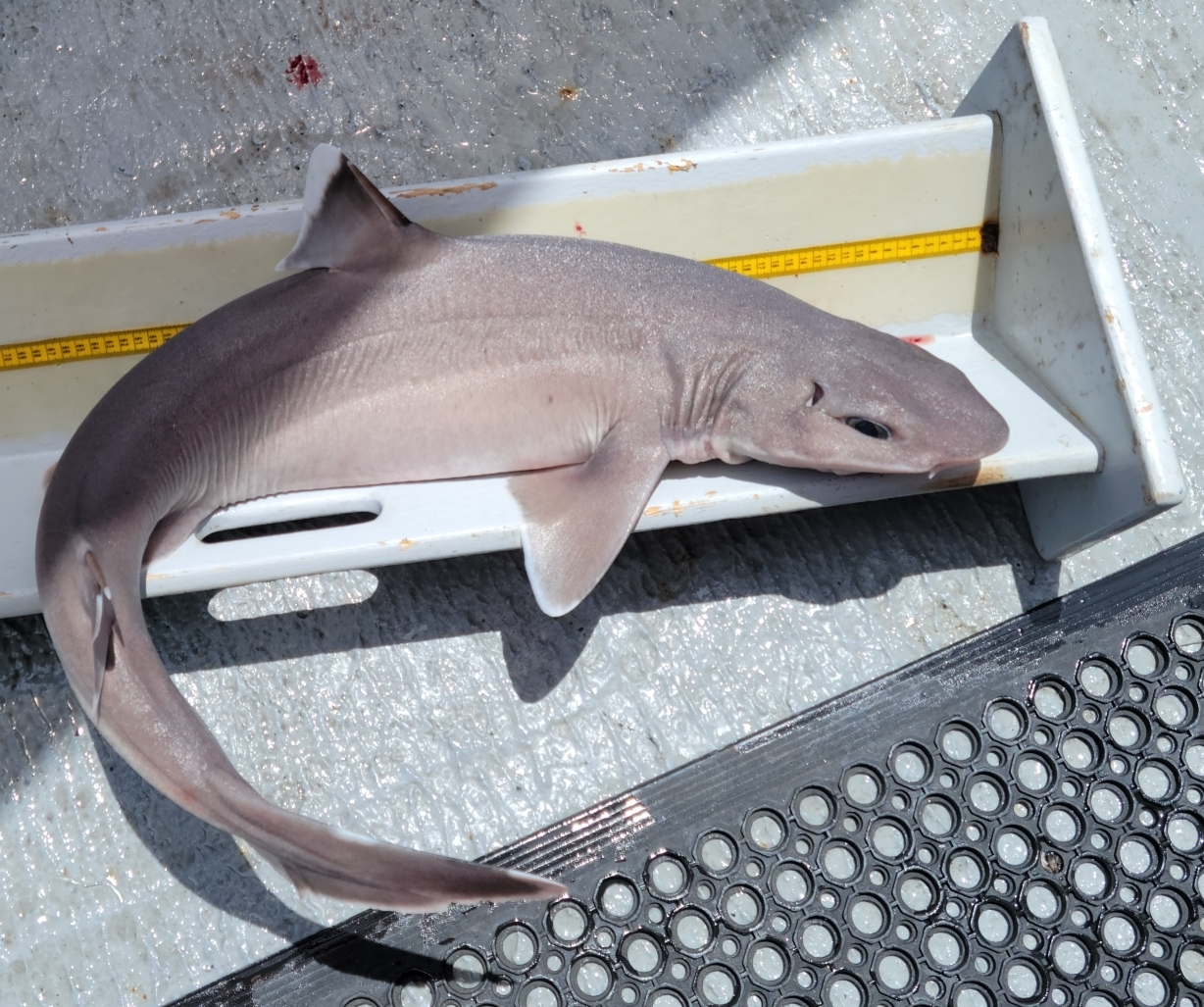
- Off the coast of South Carolina

Conservation status
- Data Deficient (IUCN 3.1)

Scientific classification
- Kingdom: Animalia
- Phylum: Chordata
- Class: Chondrichthyes
- Subclass: Elasmobranchii
- Division: Selachii
- Order: Squaliformes
- Family: Squalidae
- Genus: Cirrhigaleus
- Species: C. asper

Binomial name
- Cirrhigaleus asper (Merrett, 1973)
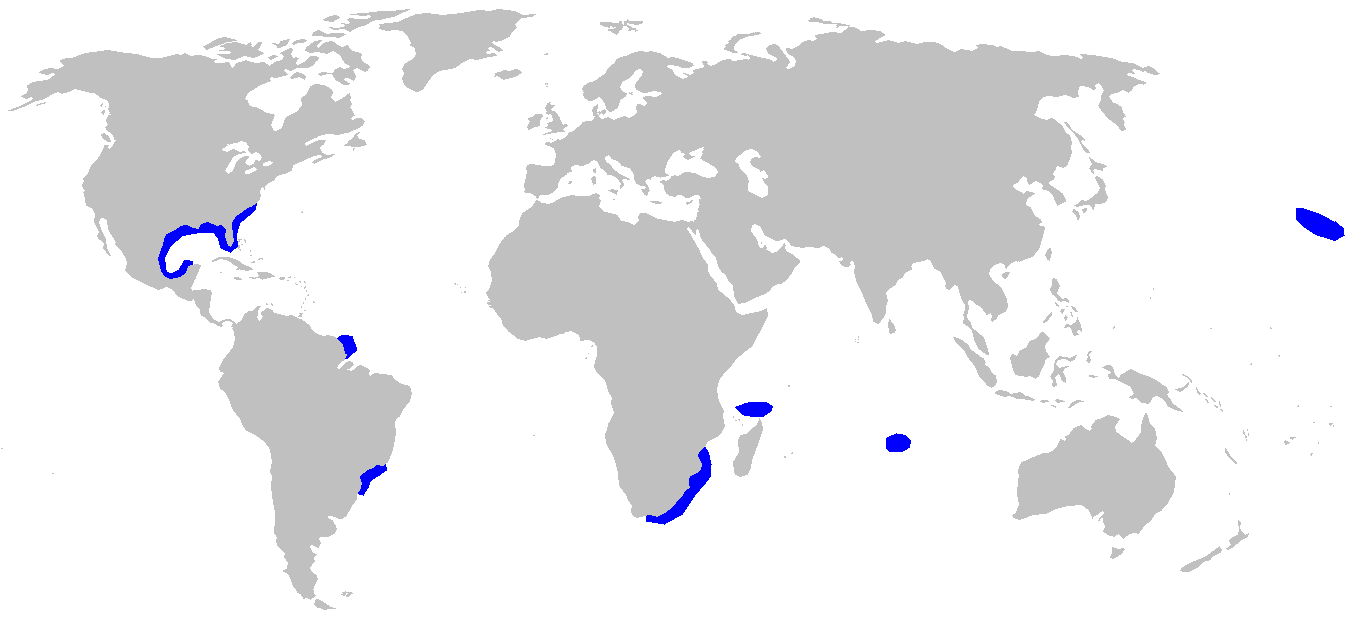
- Range of the roughskin spurdog (in blue)

= Roughskin spurdog =

Species of shark

The roughskin spurdog (Cirrhigaleus asper) is a dogfish of the family Squalidae, found circumglobally between latitudes 35°N and 35°S, at depths of between 200 metres (660 ft) and 600 metres (2,000 ft). It reaches a length of 1.2 metres (3.9 ft).

The roughskin spurdog is ovoviviparous with 21 to 22 young in a litter.

== Taxonomy ==
The roughskin spurdog was first described in 1973 as Squalus asper by British ichthyologist Nigel Merrett. It was later quickly changed to Cirrhigaleus asper. The roughskin spurdog is also known as the roughskin dogfish and roughskin dogshark in English. Genetic and morphological analyses have confirmed that Cirrhigaleus asper is a distinct species within the genus Cirrhigaleus, separate from C. barbifer and C. australis.
