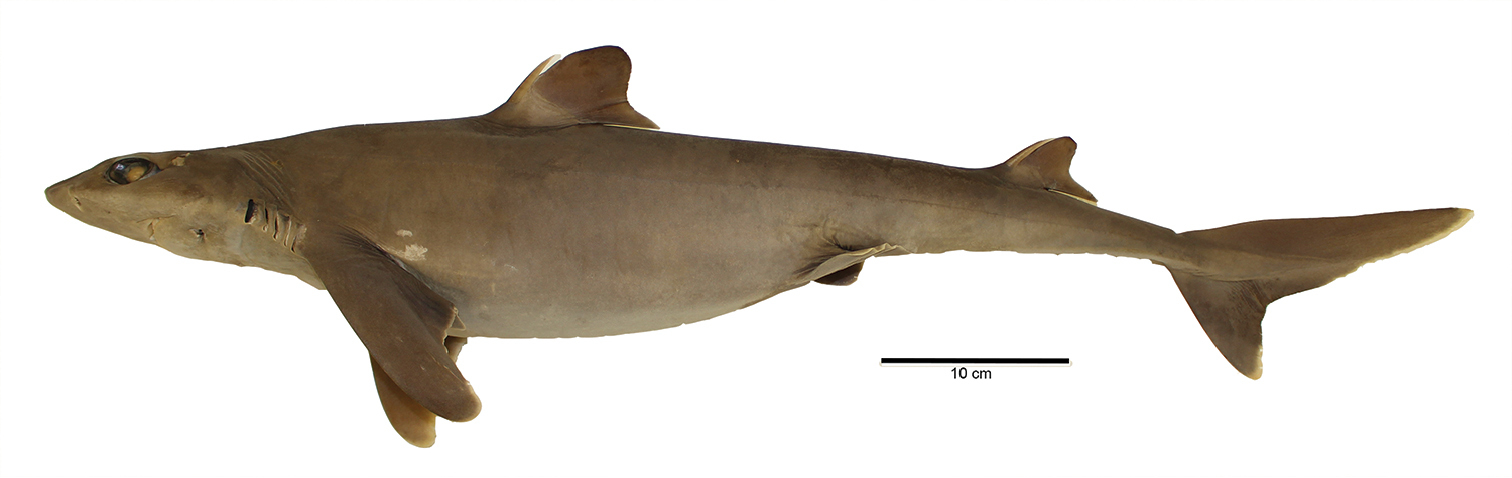

Conservation status
- Least Concern (IUCN 3.1)

Scientific classification
- Kingdom: Animalia
- Phylum: Chordata
- Class: Chondrichthyes
- Subclass: Elasmobranchii
- Division: Selachii
- Order: Squaliformes
- Family: Squalidae
- Genus: Squalus
- Species: S. hawaiiensis

Binomial name
- Squalus hawaiiensis Toby S. Daly-Engel, Amber Koch, James M. Anderson, Charles F. Cotton, R. Dean Grubbs, 2018

= Squalus hawaiiensis =

Hawaiian spurdog

Dogfish of the family Squalidae

Squalus hawaiiensis, the Hawaiian spurdog, is a dogfish, a member of the family Squalidae, found in waters surrounding the Hawaiian Islands, from the surface to 950 m. Its length is up to 75 cm.

== Taxonomy ==
Squalus hawaiiensis was once lumped with the shortspine spurdog, but morphological and genetic data showed that the Hawaiian population was distinct from S. mitsukurii individuals from Japan to be considered a distinct species.
