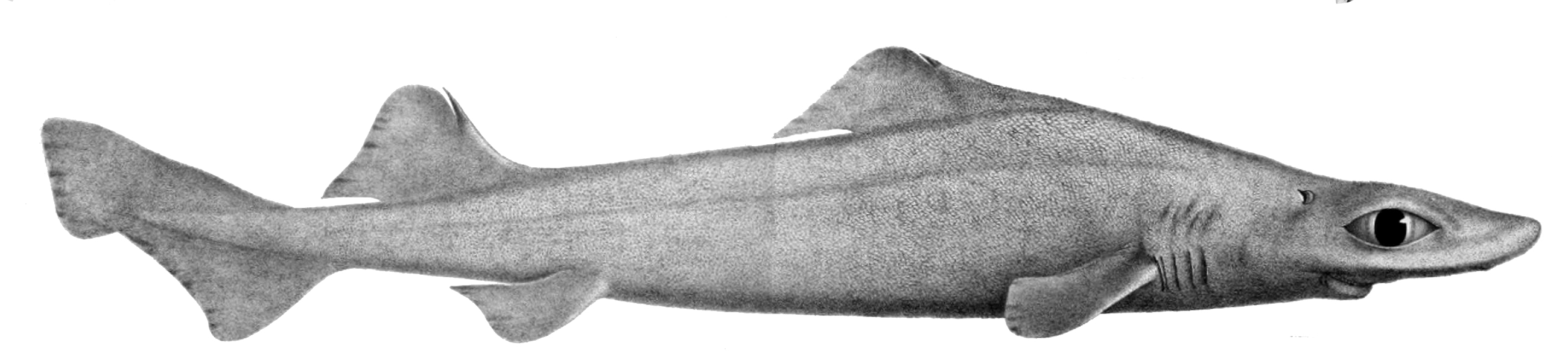
- Drawing by R. Mintern

Conservation status
- Endangered (IUCN 3.1)

Scientific classification
- Kingdom: Animalia
- Phylum: Chordata
- Class: Chondrichthyes
- Subclass: Elasmobranchii
- Division: Selachii
- Order: Squaliformes
- Family: Centrophoridae
- Genus: Centrophorus
- Species: C. squamosus

Binomial name
- Centrophorus squamosus Bonnaterre, 1788
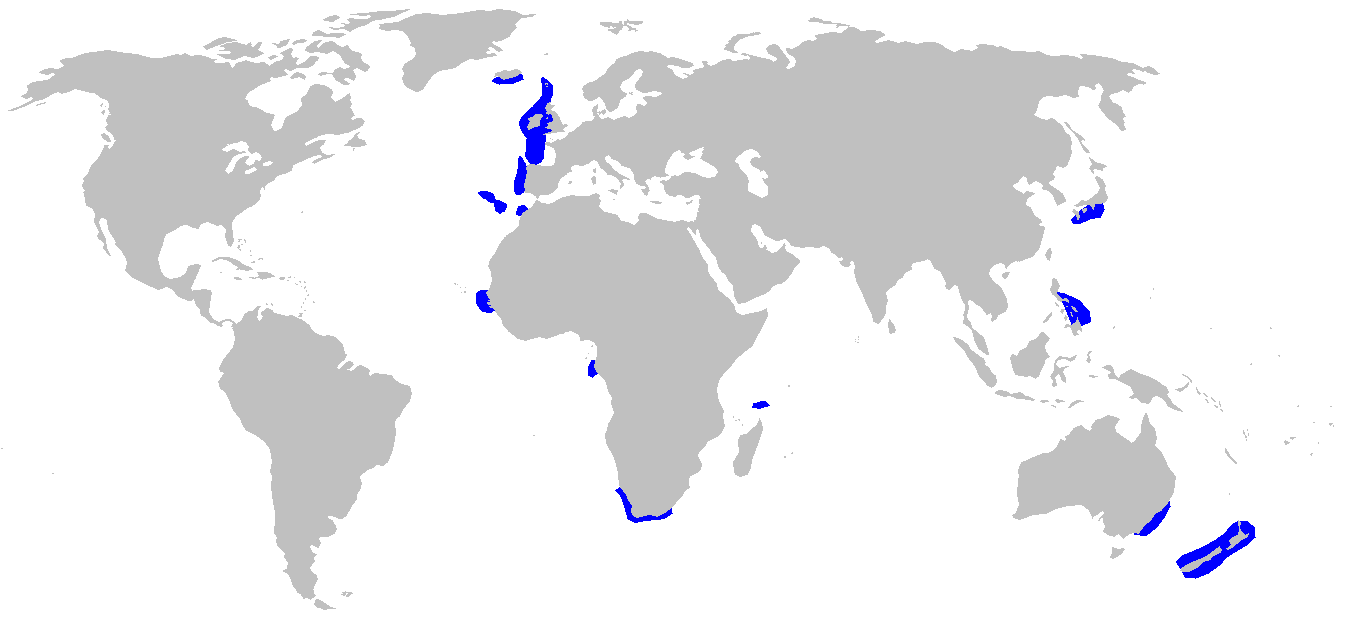
- Range of leafscale gulper shark (in blue)

Synonyms
- Centrophorus ferrugineus Meng, Hu & Li, 1982

= Leafscale gulper shark =

Species of shark

The leafscale gulper shark (Centrophorus squamosus) is a dogfish of the family Centrophoridae. C. squamosus is reported to have a lifespan of approximately 70 years, based on otolith ring counts. It was the first described species in the genus Centrophorus, which now contains 13 species.

== Physical characteristics ==
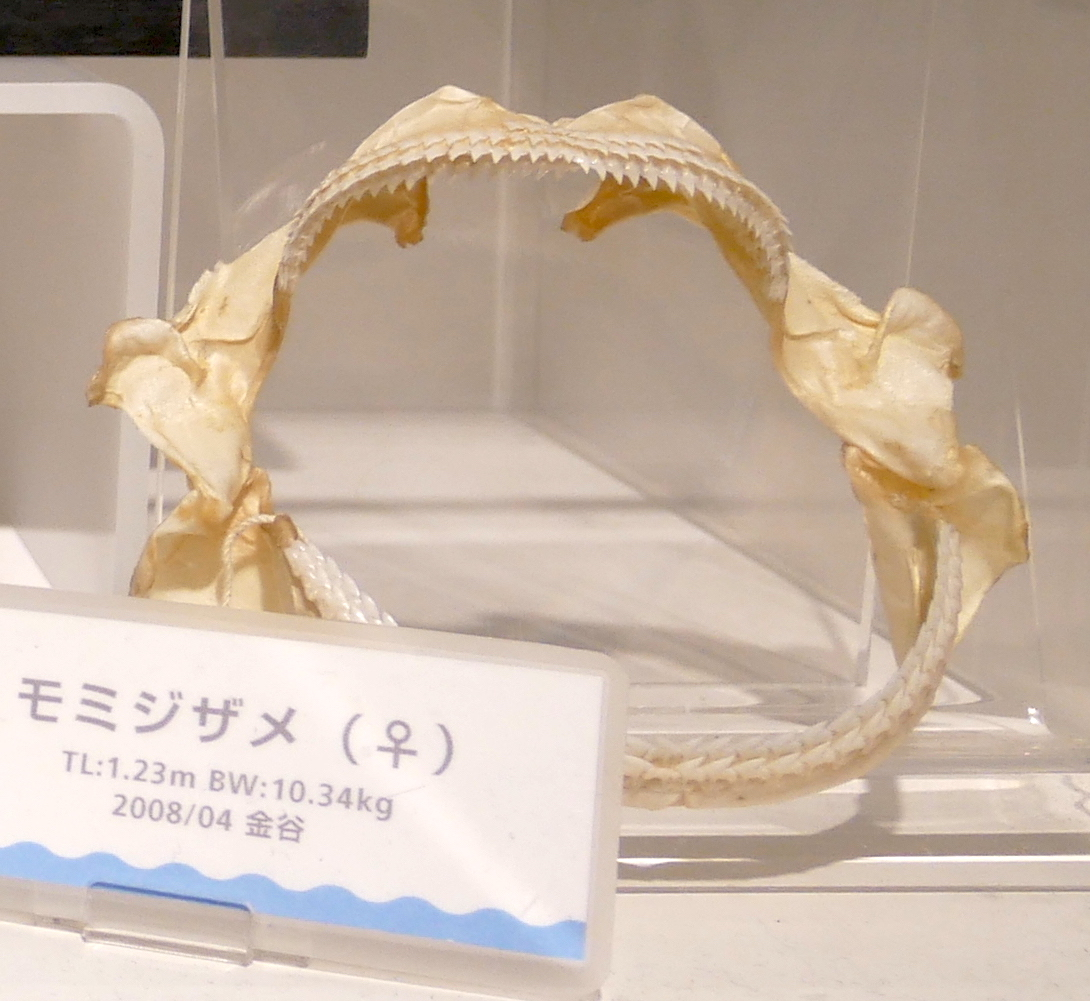
Teeth and jaw of a female leafscale gulper shark

The leafscale gulper shark has no anal fin, two dorsal fins with spines, the first dorsal being relatively low and long, large eyes, and rough leaf-like denticles. Its maximum length is 158 centimetres (5 ft 2 in).

== Distribution ==
Eastern Atlantic around continental slopes from Iceland south to the Cape of Good Hope, western Indian Ocean around Aldabra Islands, and western Pacific around Honshu, Japan, the Philippines, south-east Australia, and New Zealand.

== Habits and habitat ==
The leafscale gulper shark lives near the bottom between 230 and 2,360 metres (750 and 7,740 ft), but usually below 1,000 metres (3,300 ft). Also occurs pelagically in much deeper water. It probably feeds on fish and cephalopods.

It is ovoviviparous with a maximum of five young per litter.

Its meat is utilized dried and salted for human consumption and as fishmeal.

== Conservation status ==
The New Zealand Department of Conservation has classified the leafscale gulper shark as "Not Threatened" with the qualifier "Secure Overseas" under the New Zealand Threat Classification System.
