= Western gulper shark =

Conservation status
- Data Deficient (IUCN 3.1)

Scientific classification
- Kingdom: Animalia
- Phylum: Chordata
- Class: Chondrichthyes
- Subclass: Elasmobranchii
- Division: Selachii
- Order: Squaliformes
- Family: Centrophoridae
- Genus: Centrophorus
- Species: C. westraliensis

Binomial name
- Centrophorus westraliensis W. T. White, Ebert & Compagno, 2008
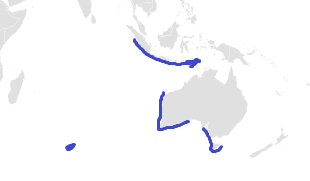
- Known range of the Western gulper shark (in blue)

Species of fish

The western gulper shark (Centrophorus westraliensis) is a species of squaliform shark discovered in 2008. The species had previously been identified as a variant of the dumb gulper shark, however was differentiated based on morphology. The western gulper is known from the waters of Western Australia, as well as Indonesia, East Timor, and islands in the Southern Indian Ocean. This shark is classified as "data deficient" by the IUCN.

== Taxonomy ==
The first description of the species was made in 2008 by William Toby White, a researcher at CSIRO in Australia, David A. Ebert, a researcher at the Pacific Shark Research Center in Moss Landing, California, and Leonard J.V. Compagno, a researcher at the Shark Research Center of the Iziko Museums. It was published in the volume Descriptions of New Australian Chondrichthyans, which also published descriptions of 36 other species of sharks, skates, rays, chimera, and rat fish.

Prior to this publication, the species was not differentiated from the dumb gulper shark (Centrophorus harrissoni), which has a similar appearance.
