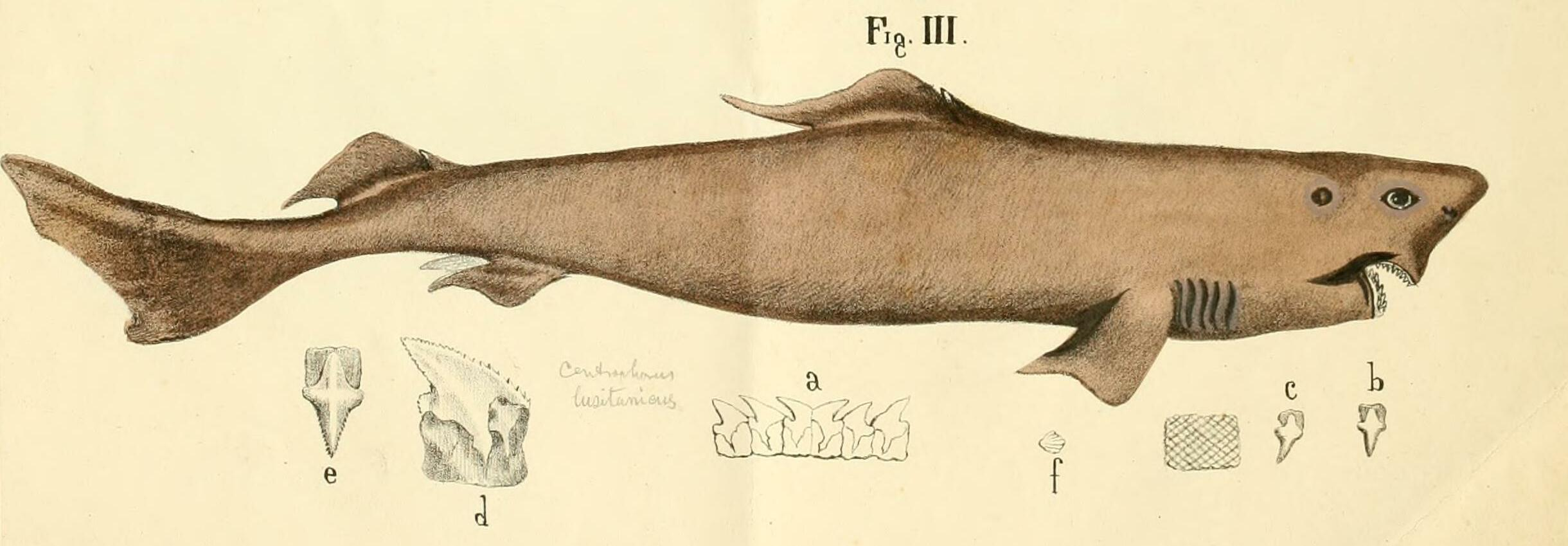

Conservation status
- Vulnerable (IUCN 3.1)

Scientific classification
- Kingdom: Animalia
- Phylum: Chordata
- Class: Chondrichthyes
- Subclass: Elasmobranchii
- Division: Selachii
- Order: Squaliformes
- Family: Centrophoridae
- Genus: Centrophorus
- Species: C. lusitanicus

Binomial name
- Centrophorus lusitanicus (Barbosa du Bocage & Brito Capello, 1864)
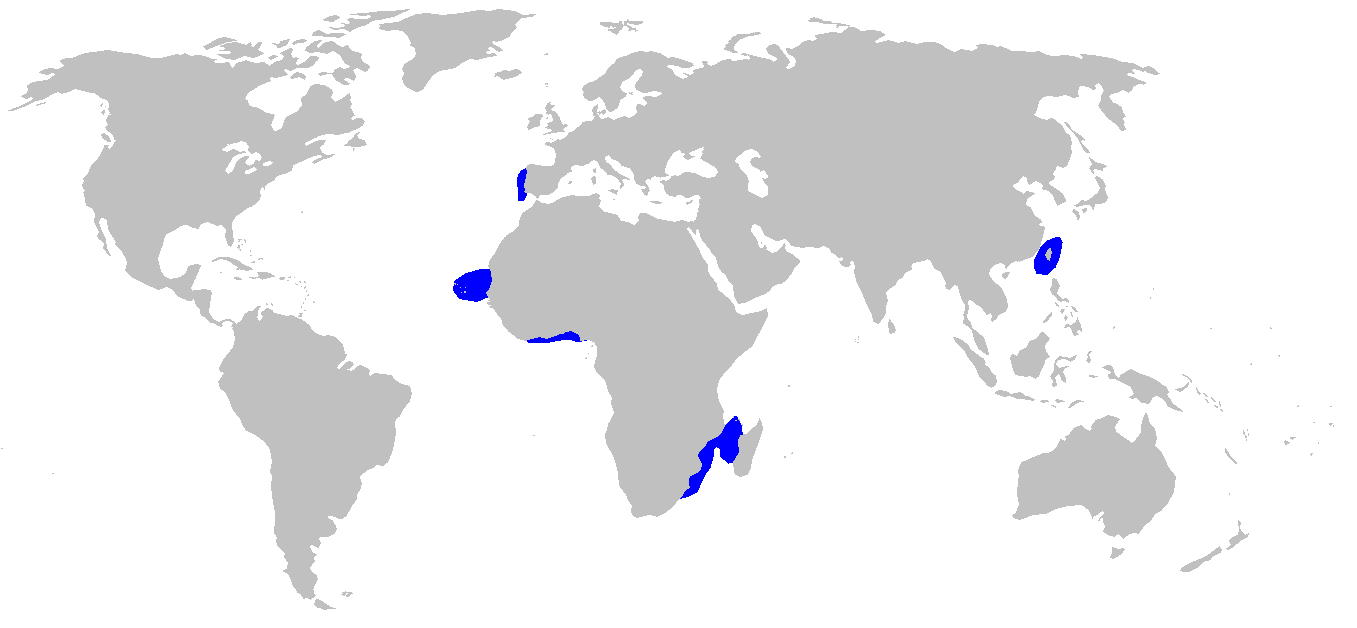
- Range of lowfin gulper shark (in blue)

= Lowfin gulper shark =

Species of shark

The lowfin gulper shark (Centrophorus lusitanicus) is a large deepwater dogfish in the family Centrophoridae.

== Physical characteristics ==
The lowfin gulper shark has no anal fin, two dorsal fins (with spines with the first dorsabeing much longer than the rear), a long, broad snout, and angular pectoral fins. Its maximum length is 1.6 m.

== Distribution ==
The lowfin gulper shark is found in the Eastern Atlantic off Portugal and West Africa, the Indian Ocean around Mozambique and Madagascar, and the West Pacific by Taiwan.

== Habits and habitat ==
Lowfin gulper sharks live at depths between 300 and 1,400 m. They are ovoviviparous and give birth to up to six pups per litter. They feed on other sharks, bony fish, crabs, and lobsters.
