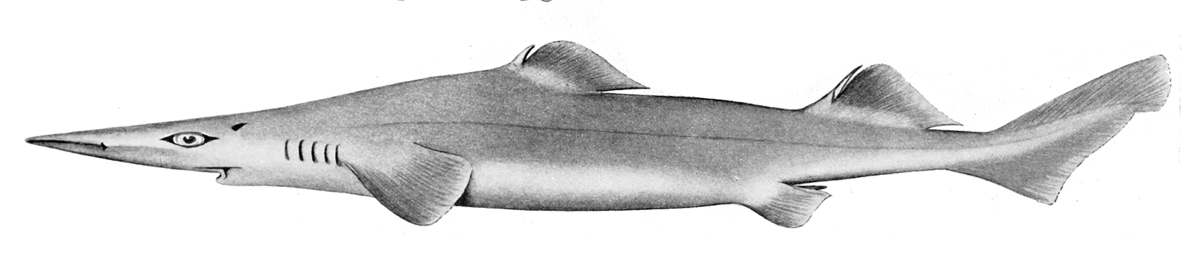

Conservation status
- Vulnerable (IUCN 3.1)

Scientific classification
- Kingdom: Animalia
- Phylum: Chordata
- Class: Chondrichthyes
- Subclass: Elasmobranchii
- Division: Selachii
- Order: Squaliformes
- Family: Centrophoridae
- Genus: Deania
- Species: D. quadrispinosa

Binomial name
- Deania quadrispinosa (McCulloch, 1915)
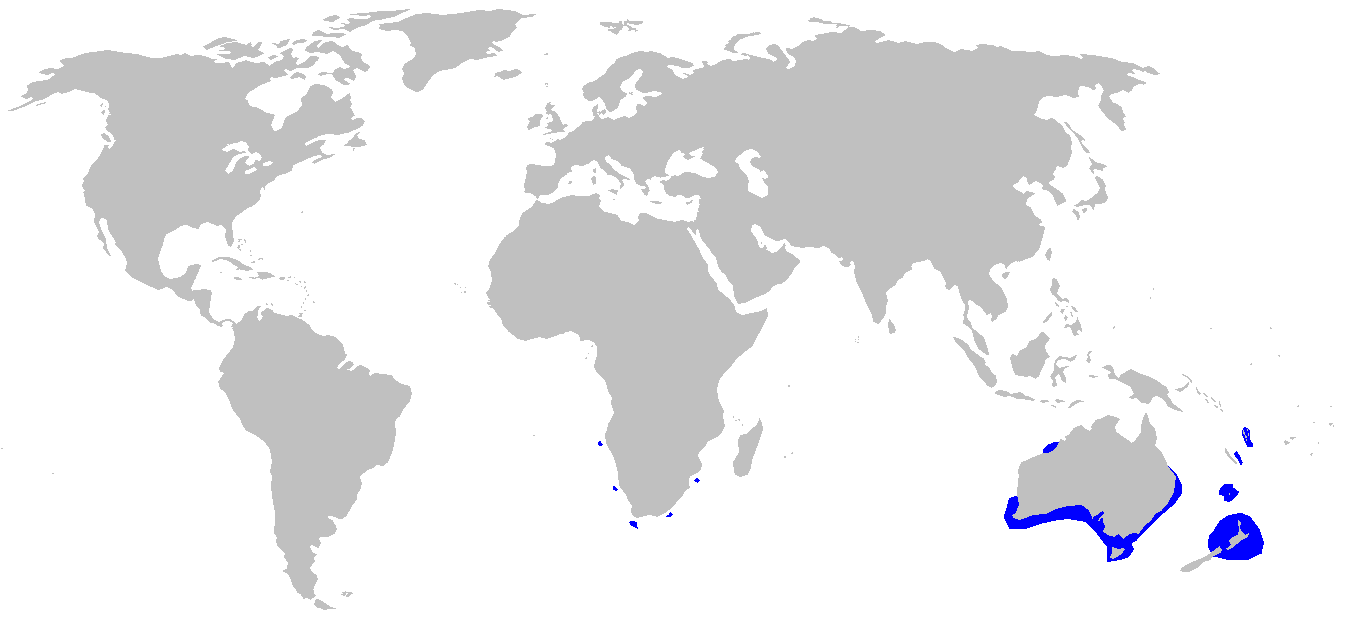
- Range of longsnout dogfish (in blue)

= Longsnout dogfish =

Species of shark

The longsnout dogfish (Deania quadrispinosa) is a little-known deepwater dogfish, found in the Atlantic and Indian Oceans from Namibia to Mozambique and in the South Pacific off southern Australia and New Zealand.

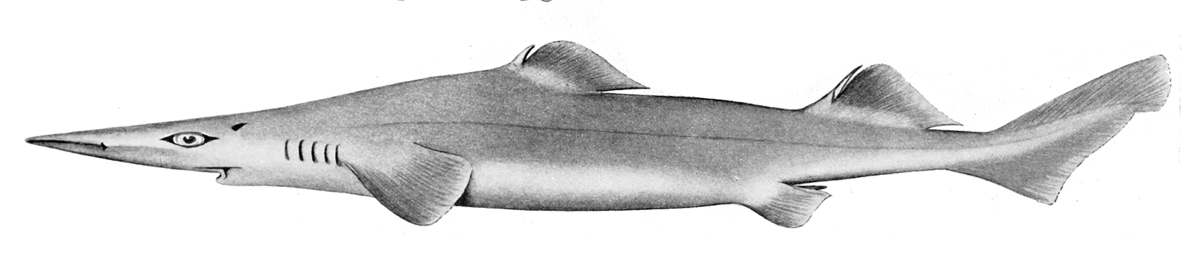
LongSnout Dogfish Illustration

The longsnout dogfish has an extremely long, angular snout, no anal fin, dorsal fins of similar size with the first placed high on the back and the second having a longer rear free tip, and pitchfork-shaped dermal denticles. It is dark brown and grows to about 114 cm.

Reproduction is ovoviviparous.

This shark lives at depths between 150 and 732 m. It eats bony fish.

== Conservation status ==
In June 2018 the New Zealand Department of Conservation classified the longsnout dogfish as "Data Deficient" with the qualifier "Secure Overseas" under the New Zealand Threat Classification System.
