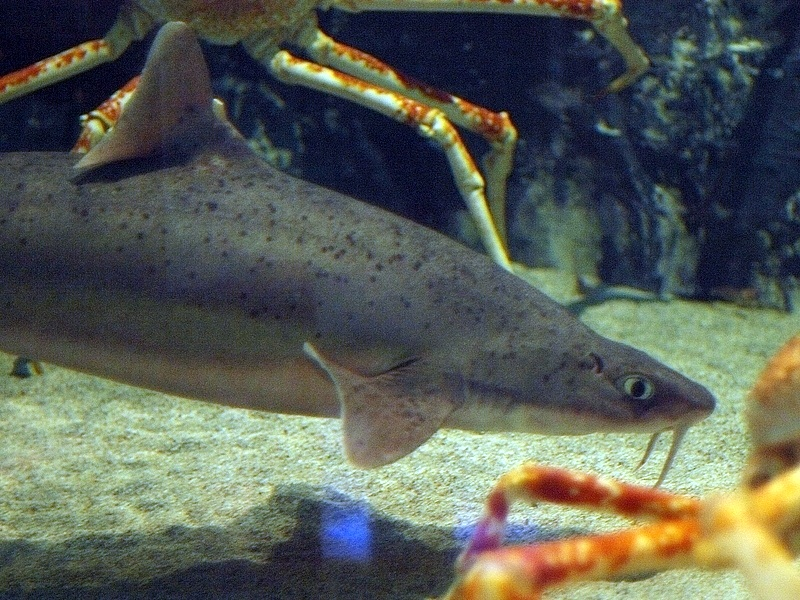

Conservation status
- Least Concern (IUCN 3.1)

Scientific classification
- Kingdom: Animalia
- Phylum: Chordata
- Class: Chondrichthyes
- Subclass: Elasmobranchii
- Division: Selachii
- Order: Squaliformes
- Family: Squalidae
- Genus: Cirrhigaleus
- Species: C. barbifer

Binomial name
- Cirrhigaleus barbifer S. Tanaka (I), 1912
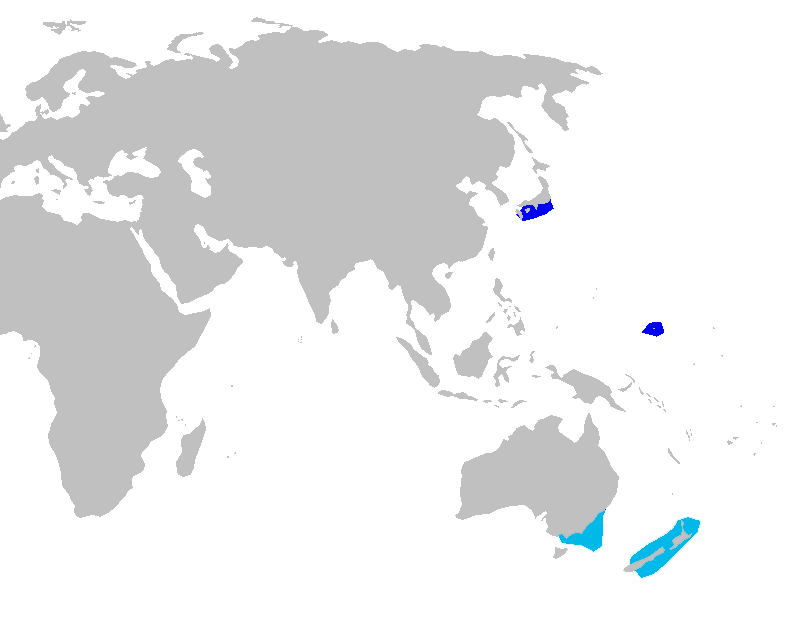
- Range of C. barbifer in dark blue and C. australis in light blue.

= Mandarin dogfish =

Species of shark

The mandarin dogfish (Cirrhigaleus barbifer) is a dogfish, a member of the family Squalidae in the order Squaliformes. It is found at depths of 140–650 metres (460–2,130 ft) off southern Japan, Taiwan, and Indonesia (Bali and Lombok). Populations off Australia and New Zealand were formerly included in this species, but in 2007 these were assigned to a new species, the southern mandarin dogfish. It is not clear which of these species is involved in other populations from the tropical West Pacific.

In March 2013 it was announced that two sharks caught near Rottnest Island off the coast of Western Australia in 2011 had been identified as Cirrhigaleus barbifer.

== History ==
The first observation of the species outside Japanese waters can be found in record from 1912, identifying Cirrhigaleus barbifer in New Zealand waters. In 1969, a female Cirrhigaleus barbifer was long-lined in about 360 m for observation, measuring 922 mm in total length. The female was found between Mayor Island and White Island in the Bay of Plenty by Mr. Goldie Hitchling on the Fair Isle, a commercial fishing vessel. The fish was sent to Wellington via the New Zealand Marine Department for identification. The second specimen was found on 22 September 1970 by Mr. J. I. Phillips on the fishing vessel Moana. This specimen was another female, long-lined in about 440 m, measuring 1082 mm in total length. Both individuals can be found in the Dominion Museum in Wellington, by their registration numbers 5105 and 5163 respectively.

The two females are the largest individuals of Cirrhigaleus barbifer recorded thus far, and are the only individuals known to reside elsewhere besides Japanese waters. Their observed location in New Zealand is indicative of the great extension of range for this species.

Cirrhigaleus barbifer was established by Tanka in 1912 as a new genus and species within Squalidae (dogfish) based on a single male individual that was found in the Tokyo Fish Market, but was later identified as being from the Sagami Sea. Elsewhere, Herre had proposed a new genus and species for a female Cirrhigaleus barbifer found in Misaki Bay in Japan. Herre had initially dubbed this individual Phaenopogon barbulifer, but upon discovery of Tanka's records, conceded the name to Cirrhigaleus barbifer. Garman (1913), Fowler (1941), and Bigelow and Schroeder (1948, 1957), used both accounts by Tanka and Herre to determine the status of Cirrhigaleus and how it relates to Squalus.

== Appearance ==
The mandarin dogfish (Cirrhigaleus barbifer) ranges in colour from grey to brown, with a pale underside. Many also display a mottled pattern near the snout and various locations along the dorsal side. Cirrhigaleus barbifer has a stout body and a short snout, with two to three rows of teeth on both upper and lower jaws . The maximum length of the species is not certain, but one of the longest lengths recorded was observed with a 125 cm mature female . On average, the males are a shorter length than their female counterparts. One of the most distinct features of the species are their elongated nasal barbels, thought to help with locating prey.

== Habitat and diet ==
The preferred habitat of Cirrhigaleus barbifer is not well documented. Based on the species' presence in Japan, Taiwan, and Indonesia, it can be inferred that deep waters in subtropical/tropical climates are likely habitats. There have been noted instances of Cirrhigaleus barbifer in New Zealand and Western Australia, suggesting that the species has a broader habitat range.

The mandarin dogfish is expected to feed on benthic fishes and certain invertebrates.

== Reproductive behaviour ==
The species is ovoviviparous which means that they have ten young in a litter or five young for each uterus with no sexual disequilibrium. The embryos range in size from 213-233 mm TL. The females seem to display aplacental viviparity which means that the eggs hatch while they are still inside of the uterus.
