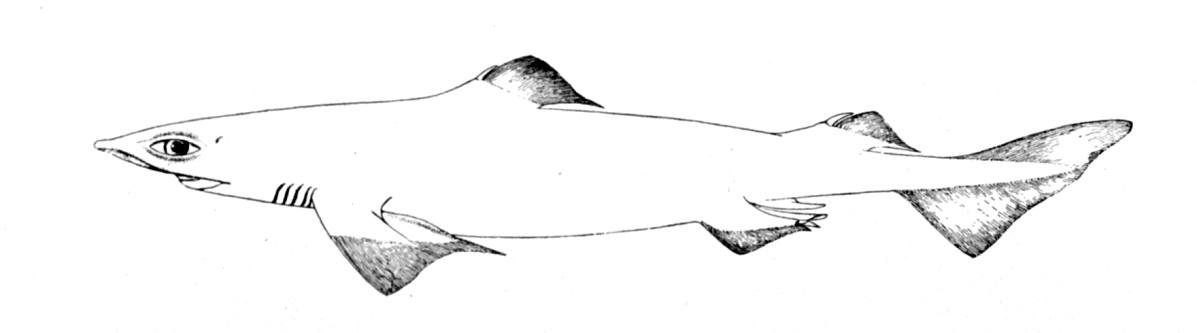
- Gulper shark, Centrophorus granulosus

Scientific classification
- Kingdom: Animalia
- Phylum: Chordata
- Class: Chondrichthyes
- Subclass: Elasmobranchii
- Division: Selachii
- Order: Squaliformes
- Family: Centrophoridae
- Genus: Centrophorus; J. P. Müller & Henle, 1837

Species
- See text.

= Centrophorus =

Centrophorus Temporal range: 94–0 Ma Turonian to present

Genus of sharks

Centrophorus is a genus of squaliform sharks. These deep-water sharks, found in temperate and tropical oceans throughout the world, are characterized by grey or brown bodies, large green eyes, and spines on both dorsal fins. These spines give them their name, from Greek κεντρον, kentron meaning "thorn" and φέρειν, pherein meaning "to bear".

The genus is present in the fossil record from the Paleocene (C. squamosus) onwards.

== Species ==
- Centrophorus atromarginatus Garman, 1913. (dwarf gulper shark)
- Centrophorus granulosus Bloch & Schneider, 1801 (gulper shark)
- Centrophorus harrissoni McCulloch, 1915 (dumb gulper shark)
- Centrophorus isodon Y. T. Chu, Q. W. Meng & J. X. Liu, 1981 (blackfin gulper shark)
- Centrophorus lusitanicus Barbosa du Bocage & Brito Capello, 1864 (lowfin gulper shark)
- Centrophorus moluccensis Bleeker, 1860 (smallfin gulper shark)
- Centrophorus seychellorum Baranes, 2003 (Seychelles gulper shark)
- Centrophorus squamosus Bonnaterre, 1788 (leafscale gulper shark)
- Centrophorus tessellatus Garman, 1906 (mosaic gulper shark)
- Centrophorus uyato Rafinesque, 1810 (little gulper shark)
- Centrophorus westraliensis W. T. White, Ebert & Compagno, 2008 (western gulper shark)
- Centrophorus zeehaani W. T. White, Ebert & Compagno, 2008 (southern dogfish)
- Centrophorus sp. A Not yet described (minigulper)
- Centrophorus sp. B Not yet described (slender gulper)

== See also ==
- List of prehistoric cartilaginous fish
