= Rough longnose dogfish =

Scientific classification
- Kingdom: Animalia
- Phylum: Chordata
- Class: Chondrichthyes
- Subclass: Elasmobranchii
- Division: Selachii
- Order: Squaliformes
- Family: Centrophoridae
- Genus: Deania
- Species: D. hystricosa

Binomial name
- Deania hystricosa (Garman, 1906)
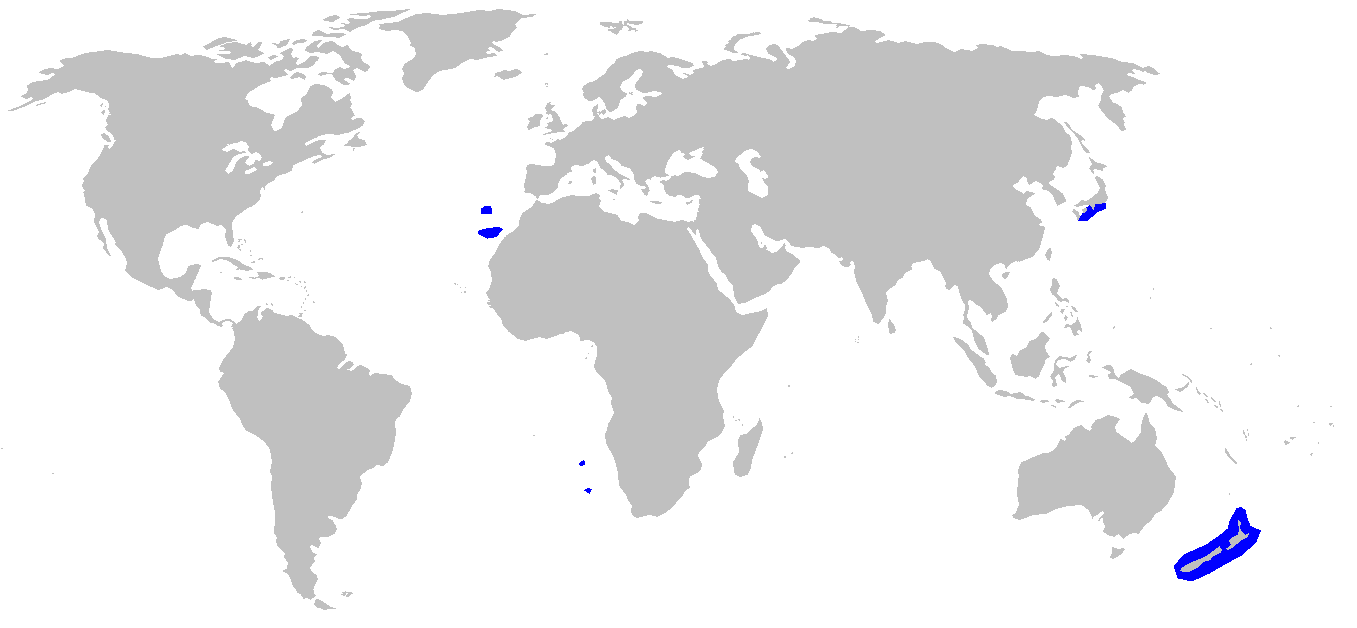
- Range of rough longnose dogfish (in blue)

Species of shark

The rough longnose dogfish (Deania hystricosa) is a little-known deepwater dogfish. This species was described by Samuel Garman in 1906 and originally named Acanthidium hystricosa.

The rough longnose dogfish has an extremely long snout, no anal fin, small grooved dorsal spines, and rough, pitchfork-shaped dermal denticles. The first dorsal fin is long and narrow.

Maximum length is 109 cm. Found in the Eastern Atlantic around Madeira and in the western Pacific around southern Japan, this shark is rarely seen, but lives between 600 and 1,000 m. It is ovoviviparous with probably around 12 pups per litter.

In June 2018 the New Zealand Department of Conservation classified the rough longnose shark as "Data Deficient" under the New Zealand Threat Classification System.
