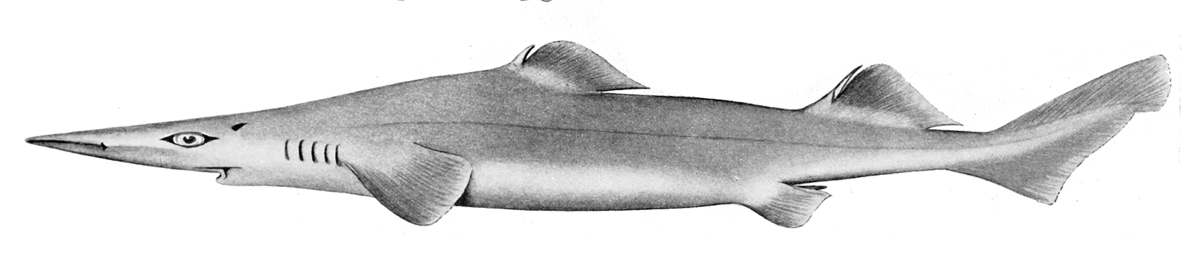
- Longsnout dogfish (Deania quadrispinosa)

Scientific classification
- Kingdom: Animalia
- Phylum: Chordata
- Class: Chondrichthyes
- Subclass: Elasmobranchii
- Division: Selachii
- Order: Squaliformes
- Family: Centrophoridae
- Genus: Deania; D. S. Jordan & Snyder, 1902

Type species
- Deania eglantina Jordan & Snyder, 1902

Species
- See text.

= Deania =

Deania Temporal range: 23–0 Ma Early Miocene to present

Genus of sharks

Deania is a genus of long-snouted, deepwater dogfish sharks in the family Centrophoridae.

== Species ==
- Deania calcea R. T. Lowe, 1839 (birdbeak dogfish)
- Deania hystricosa Garman, 1906 (rough longnose dogfish)
- Deania profundorum H. M. Smith & Radcliffe, 1912 (arrowhead dogfish)
- Deania quadrispinosa McCulloch, 1915 (longsnout dogfish)

== Habitats ==
In the North Atlantic Waters, three species of the genus Deania have been reported; Deania calcea, Deania hystricosa and Deania profundorum. However, in the North Spanish waters, only Deania calcea and Deania profundorum have been caught.

== Taxonomy ==
Deania species have two dorsal fins with strong grooved spines, no anal fin, and a strong sub terminal notch on the caudal fin. Typically, identification characteristics such as dermal denticles and teeth have been utilized to distinguish between elasmobranch species.

== See also ==
- List of prehistoric cartilaginous fish

== Sources ==
- Froese, Rainer; Pauly, Daniel (eds.). "Species in genus Deania". FishBase. February 2011 version.
- Tony Ayling & Geoffrey Cox, Collins Guide to the Sea Fishes of New Zealand, (William Collins Publishers Ltd, Auckland, New Zealand 1982) ISBN 0-00-216987-8
