= Seychelles gulper shark =

Conservation status
- Least Concern (IUCN 3.1)

Scientific classification
- Kingdom: Animalia
- Phylum: Chordata
- Class: Chondrichthyes
- Subclass: Elasmobranchii
- Division: Selachii
- Order: Squaliformes
- Family: Centrophoridae
- Genus: Centrophorus
- Species: C. seychellorum

Binomial name
- Centrophorus seychellorum Baranes, 2003
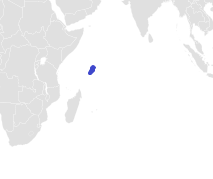
- Known range of the Seychelles gulper shark (in blue)

Species of fish

The Seychelles gulper shark (Centrophorus seychellorum) is a species of fish in the family Centrophoridae found in Alphonse island in Seychelles. This species is distinguished by having large tip of snout to first dorsal distance of 34% TL; first dorsal fin high (7% TL); second dorsal fin base long (9.8% TL); long snout (12.2% TL); uniformly grey with tip and the trailing edge of dorsal fins blackish. It is one of 11 described species in the genus Centrophorus.
