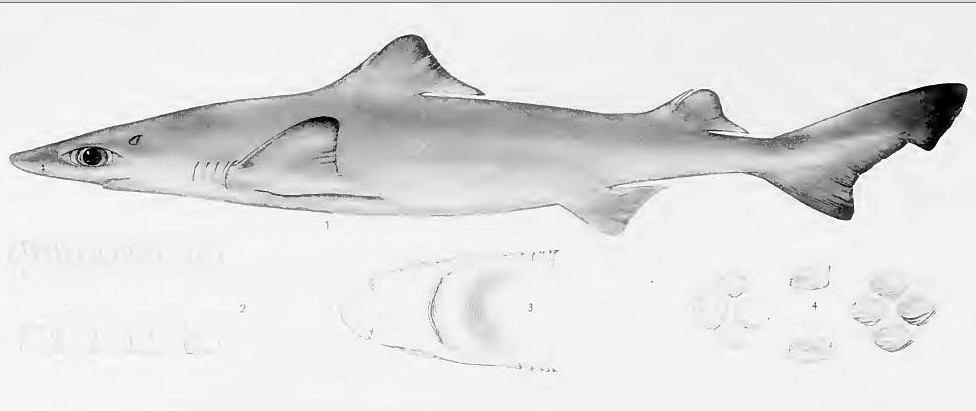

Conservation status
- Critically Endangered (IUCN 3.1)

Scientific classification
- Kingdom: Animalia
- Phylum: Chordata
- Class: Chondrichthyes
- Subclass: Elasmobranchii
- Division: Selachii
- Order: Squaliformes
- Family: Centrophoridae
- Genus: Centrophorus
- Species: C. atromarginatus

Binomial name
- Centrophorus atromarginatus Garman, 1913
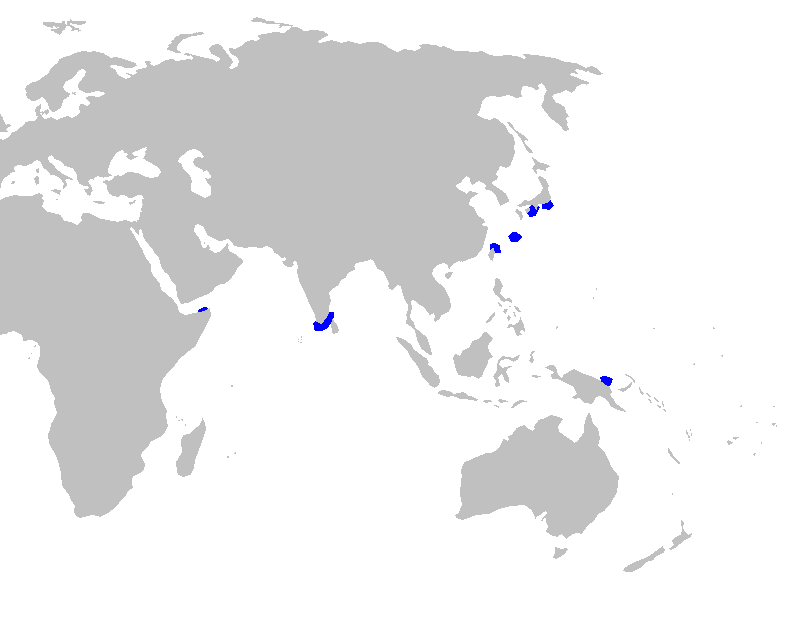
- Range of dwarf gulper shark (in blue)

= Dwarf gulper shark =

Species of shark

The dwarf gulper shark (Centrophorus atromarginatus) is a dogfish of the family Centrophoridae.

== Physical characteristics ==
The maximum total length recorded for the gulper shark is 5 ft (150 cm). Gulper shark pups average from 1 to 1.4 ft (30-42 cm) total length at birth. Precise details of the size, age, and growth, such as size at maturity for the gulper shark, are currently unknown. The gulper shark is a slim, relatively long dogfish with two dorsal fins bearing long grooved spines. The second dorsal fin is shorter than the first, and its base is about three-fourths the length of the first dorsal fin. The distance from the first and second dorsal fins is equal to the distance from the tip of the snout to the axil of the pectoral fin. The color of the gulper shark is olive-grey to grey-brown or sandy grey to brown dorsally and lighter ventrally with no obvious markings in adults; juveniles may be lighter and may have dusky tips on the dorsal and caudal fins.

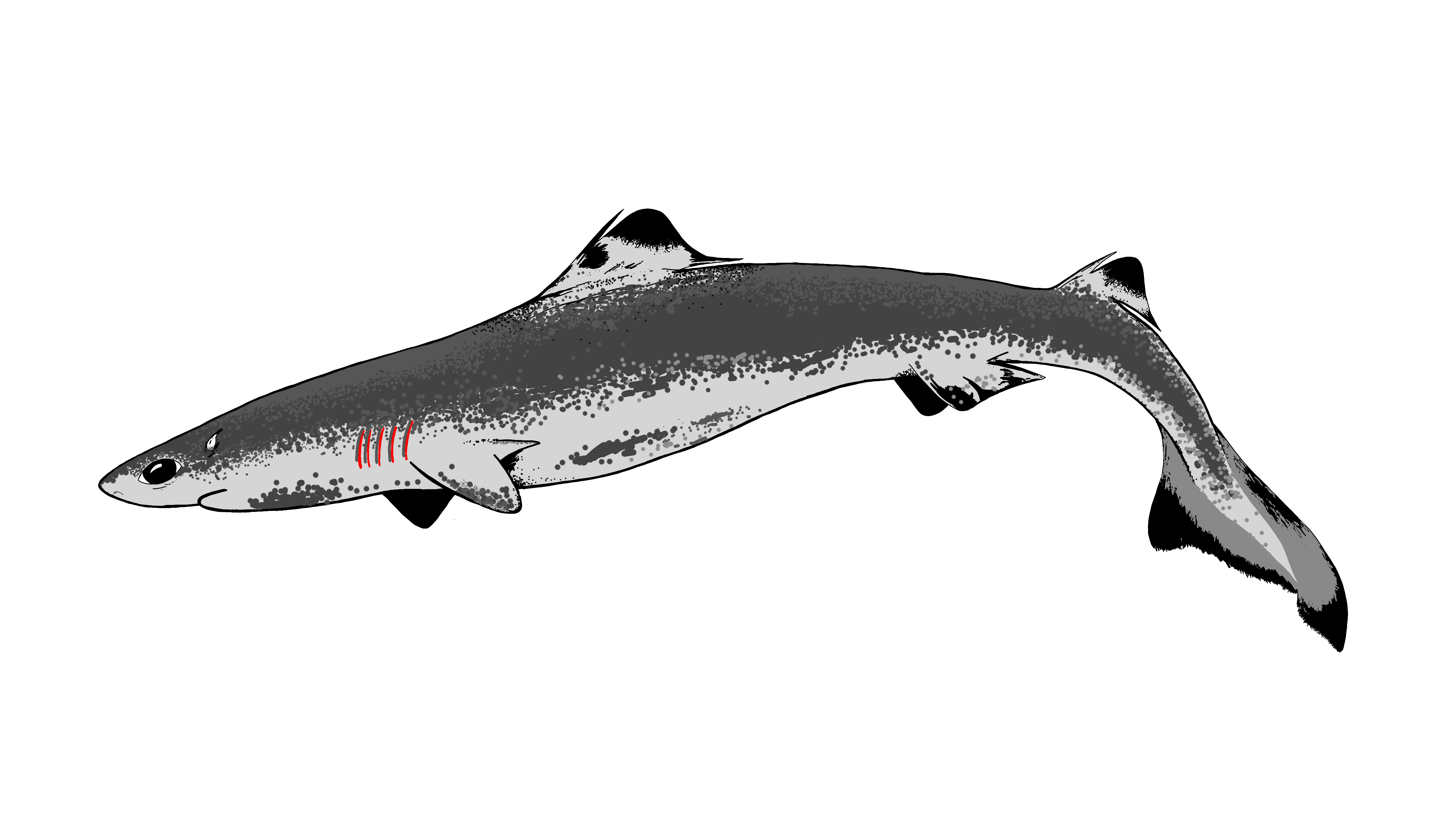
Illustration of Centrophorus atromarginatus

== Distribution ==
The dwarf gulper shark is found in the Indo-West Pacific oceans, from the Gulf of Aden, Japan and Taiwan to northern Papua New Guinea.

== Habits and habitat ==
The dwarf gulper shark lives and feeds at depths exceeding 656 ft (m) in marine and deep-water. Dogfish are most commonly found between 328 ft and 3937 ft (100-1200 meters)
