= Blackfin gulper shark =

Conservation status
- Endangered (IUCN 3.1)

Scientific classification
- Kingdom: Animalia
- Phylum: Chordata
- Class: Chondrichthyes
- Subclass: Elasmobranchii
- Division: Selachii
- Order: Squaliformes
- Family: Centrophoridae
- Genus: Centrophorus
- Species: C. isodon

Binomial name
- Centrophorus isodon (Y. T. Chu, Q. W. Meng & J. X. Liu, 1981)
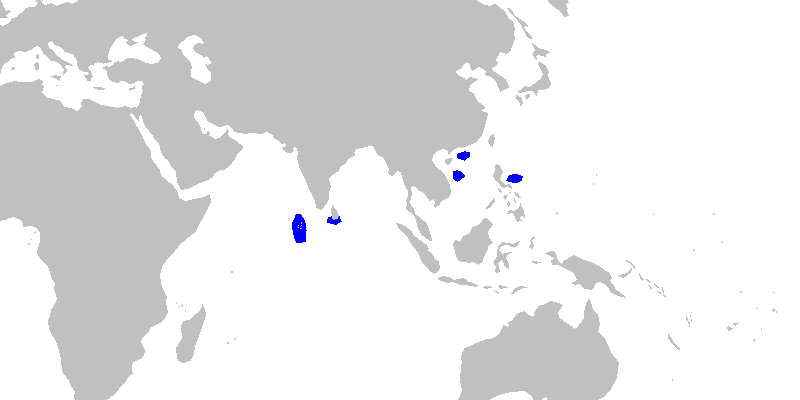
- Range of blackfin gulper shark (in blue)

Species of shark

The blackfin gulper shark (Centrophorus isodon) is a dogfish of the family Centrophoridae in the Northwest Pacific.

== Commercial uses ==
Threats are not entirely clear but they may be bycatching from deepwater trawling and line fisheries and may also be used for cod liver oil and fish meal.
