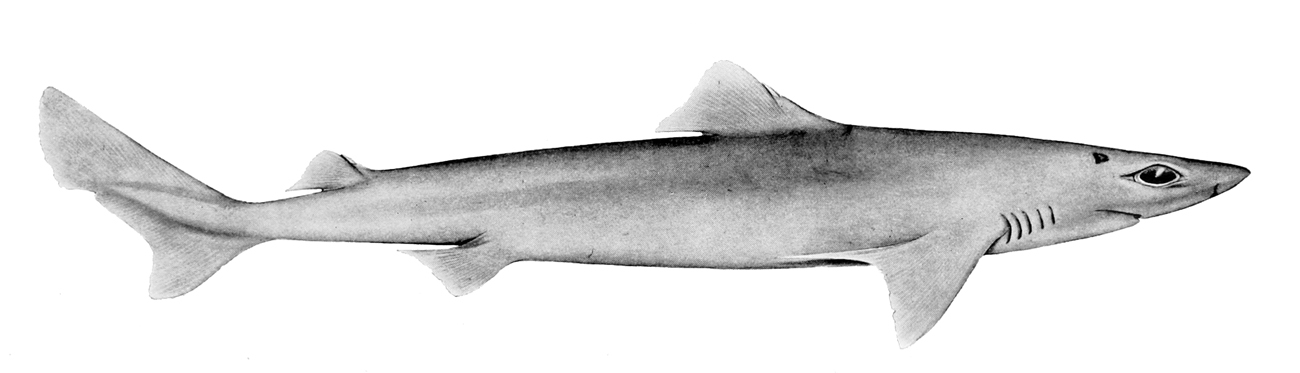

Conservation status
- Vulnerable (IUCN 3.1)

Scientific classification
- Kingdom: Animalia
- Phylum: Chordata
- Class: Chondrichthyes
- Subclass: Elasmobranchii
- Division: Selachii
- Order: Squaliformes
- Family: Centrophoridae
- Genus: Centrophorus
- Species: C. moluccensis

Binomial name
- Centrophorus moluccensis (Bleeker, 1860)
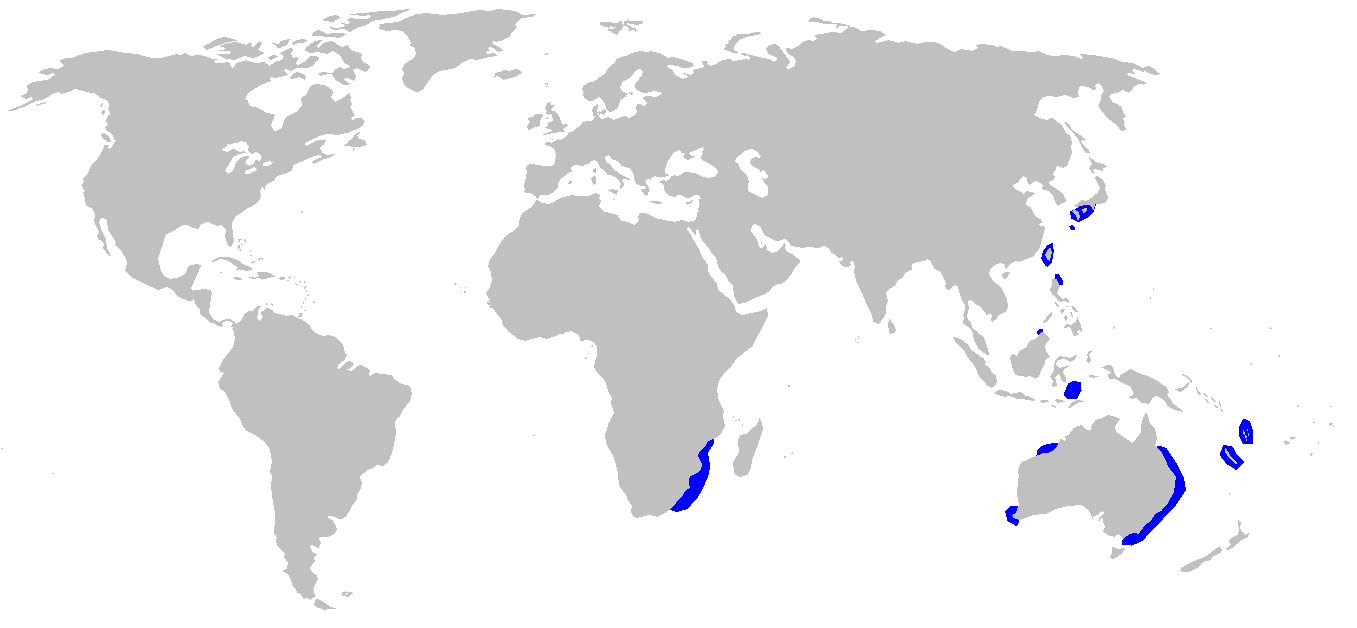
- Range of smallfin gulper shark (in blue)

= Smallfin gulper shark =

Species of shark

The smallfin gulper shark or endeavour dogfish, (Centrophorus moluccensis) is a medium-sized deepwater dogfish in the family Centrophoridae.

== Physical characteristics ==
The smallfin gulper has no anal fin, two dorsal fins with spines, long free rear tips on pectoral fins, and a deeply notched caudal fin. Its maximum length is 98 cm (39 in).

== Distribution ==
The smallfin gulper is found in the western Indian Ocean off South Africa and Mozambique, and the western Pacific off Honshū, Japan, Indonesia, New Hebrides, New Caledonia, and Australia. The Australian populations are regarded as near threatened in the Eastern and least concern in the Western populations.

== Habits and habitat ==
Smallfin gulpers are common deepwater sharks. They live near the bottom between 130 m (430 ft) and 820 m (2,690 ft). They are ovoviviparous and have two pups per litter. Their diets are primarily bony fish, but also other sharks, molluscs, crustaceans, and even tunicates are consumed.
