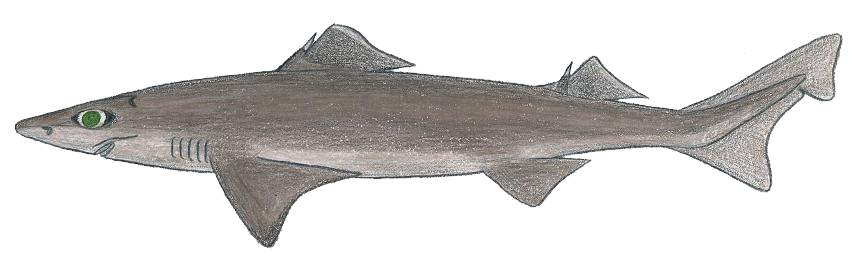

Conservation status
- Endangered (IUCN 3.1)

Scientific classification
- Kingdom: Animalia
- Phylum: Chordata
- Class: Chondrichthyes
- Subclass: Elasmobranchii
- Division: Selachii
- Order: Squaliformes
- Family: Centrophoridae
- Genus: Centrophorus
- Species: C. tessellatus

Binomial name
- Centrophorus tessellatus (Garman, 1906)
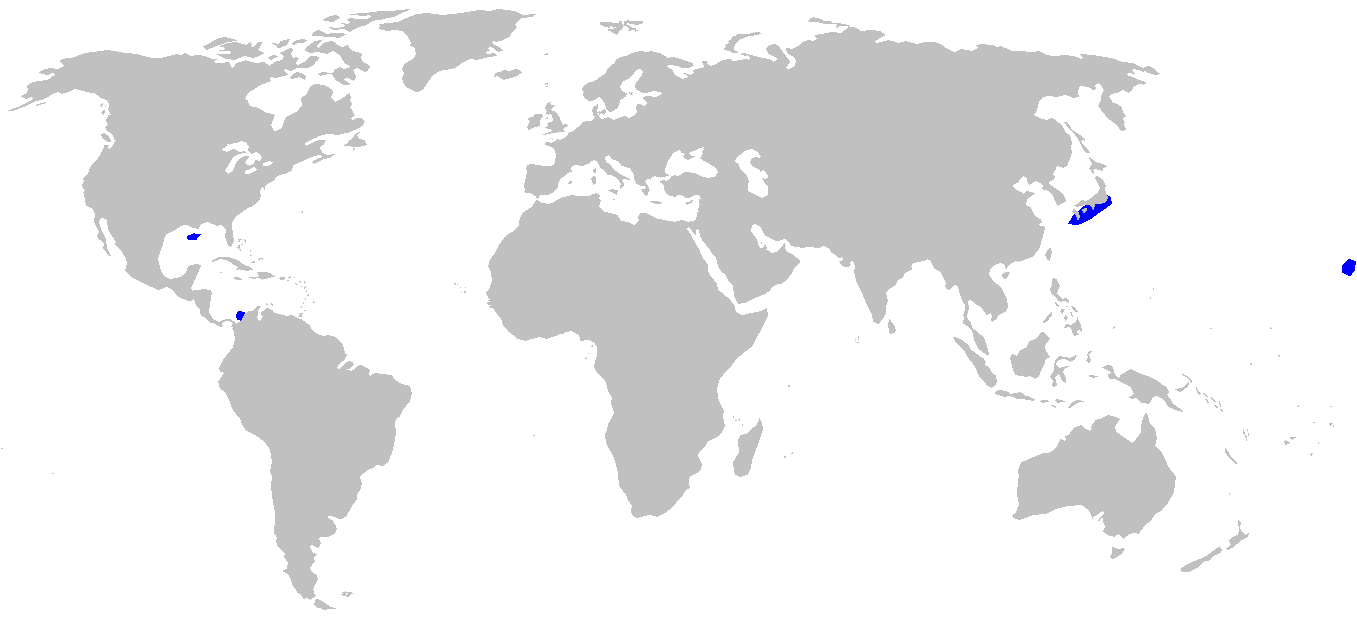
- Range of mosaic gulper shark (in blue)

= Mosaic gulper shark =

Species of shark

The mosaic gulper shark (Centrophorus tessellatus) is a small rare deepwater dogfish, found in the Pacific Ocean around Honshū, Japan and the Hawaiian Islands at depths between 260 and 728 m. It is one of 13 described species in the genus Centrophorus.

The mosaic gulper shark has no anal fin, two dorsal fins with large spines (the second dorsal is relatively high, almost as high as the first), large eyes, angular extended free tips on the pectoral fins, and a moderately notched caudal fin. It has a maximum length of 89 cm (35 in). The mosaic gulper shark features a moderately long, parabolic snout with a width that is slightly greater than that of its mouth. Its mouth includes sets of sharp, unicuspid teeth in both its upper and lower jaws, with the lower sets being larger than the top. The mosaic gulper shark is ovoviviparous and produces litters of 1 to 2 pups.

Being found at depths between 260 and 728 m, the mosaic gulper shark is rare enough that it has no significance to fisheries, contrary to others of the genus Cemtrophorus.

The mosaic gulper shark's conservation status is currently classified as endangered.

The mosaic gulper shark seems to be harmless to humans.
