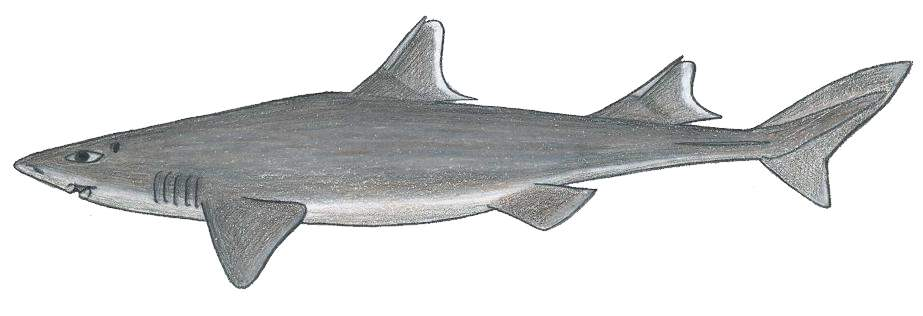
- Roughskin spurdog (Cirrhigaleus asper)

Scientific classification
- Kingdom: Animalia
- Phylum: Chordata
- Class: Chondrichthyes
- Subclass: Elasmobranchii
- Division: Selachii
- Order: Squaliformes
- Family: Squalidae
- Genus: Cirrhigaleus; S. Tanaka (I), 1912

= Cirrhigaleus =

Genus of sharks

Cirrhigaleus is a genus of sharks in the Squalidae (dogfish) family, which is part of the Squaliformes order.

== Species ==
- Cirrhigaleus asper Merrett, 1973 (roughskin spurdog)
- Cirrhigaleus australis W. T. White, Last & Stevens, 2007 (southern mandarin dogfish)
- Cirrhigaleus barbifer S. Tanaka (I), 1912 (mandarin dogfish)
