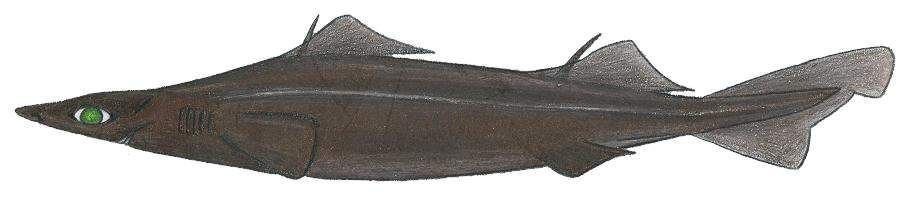

Conservation status
- Near Threatened (IUCN 3.1)

Scientific classification
- Kingdom: Animalia
- Phylum: Chordata
- Class: Chondrichthyes
- Subclass: Elasmobranchii
- Division: Selachii
- Order: Squaliformes
- Family: Centrophoridae
- Genus: Deania
- Species: D. profundorum

Binomial name
- Deania profundorum (H. M. Smith & Radcliff, 1912)
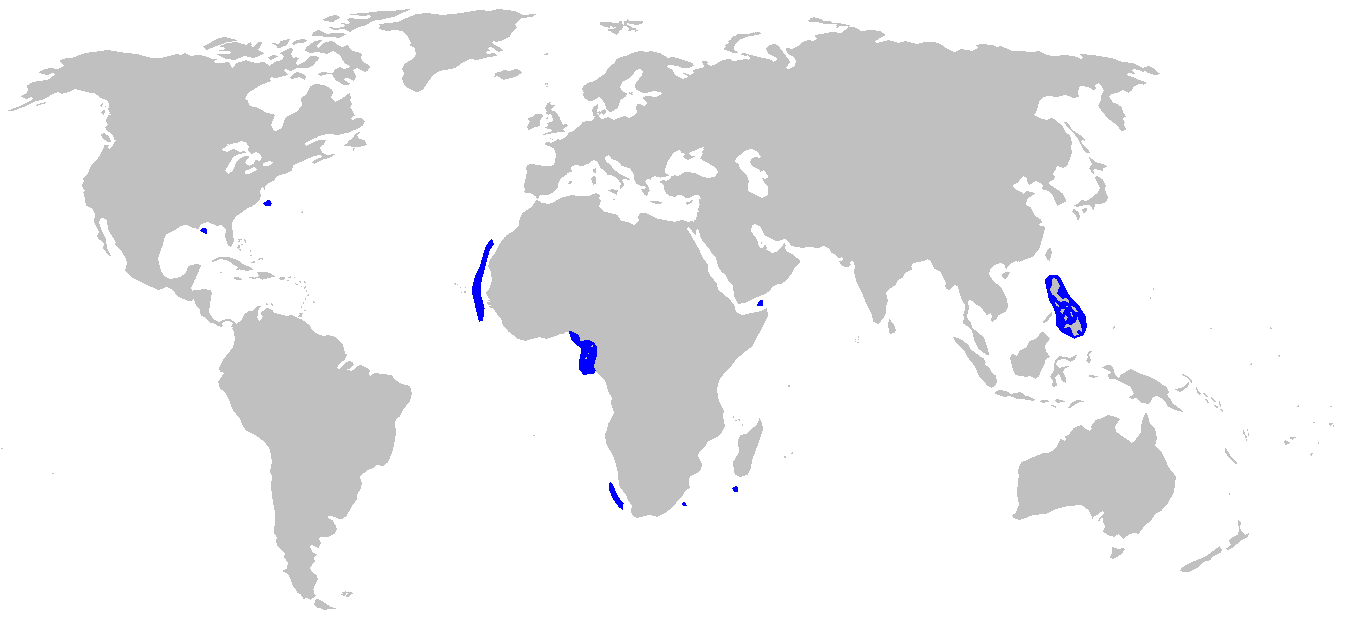
- Range of arrownose dogfish (in blue)

Synonyms
- Deania elegans Springer, 1959

= Arrowhead dogfish =

Species of shark

The arrowhead dogfish (Deania profundorum) is a small little known deepwater dogfish of the family Centrophoridae.

== Physical characteristics ==
The arrowhead dogfish has an extremely long angular snout, no anal fin, small first dorsal and long rear dorsal spines, and pitchfork-shaped dermal denticles. The first dorsal fin is short and placed high on the back. This is the smallest of the genus Deania, with a maximum length of only 76 cm.

== Distribution ==
It is found in the Pacific Ocean around the Philippines, in the Western Atlantic Ocean off of the Carolinas, in the Eastern Atlantic all along Africa's west coast, and in the Indian Ocean off South Africa.

== Habits and habitat ==
This shark is a little-known deepwater species that lives at depths between 300 and 1,785 m. It is ovoviviparous with five to seven pups per litter. It eats bony fish, squid, and crustaceans.
