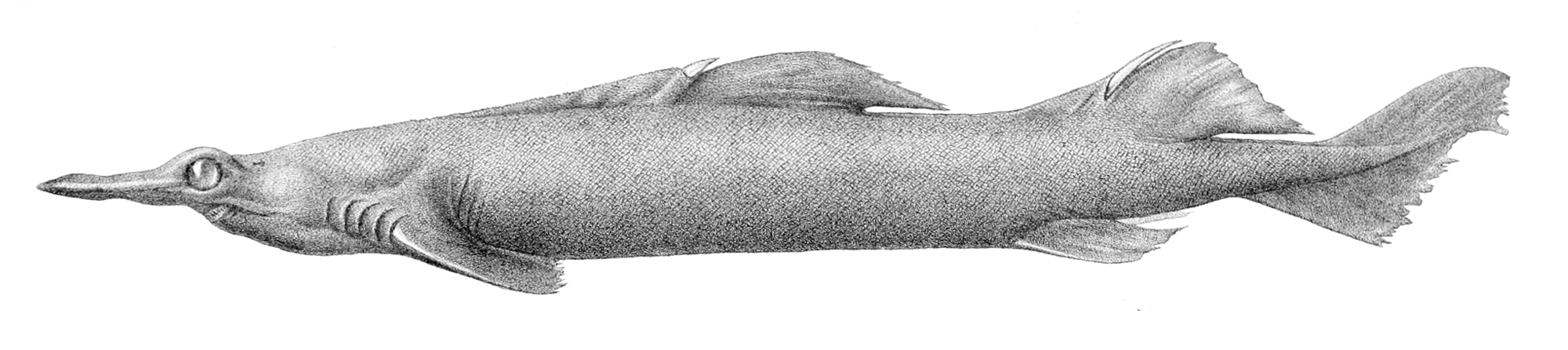
- Drawing by Bideault
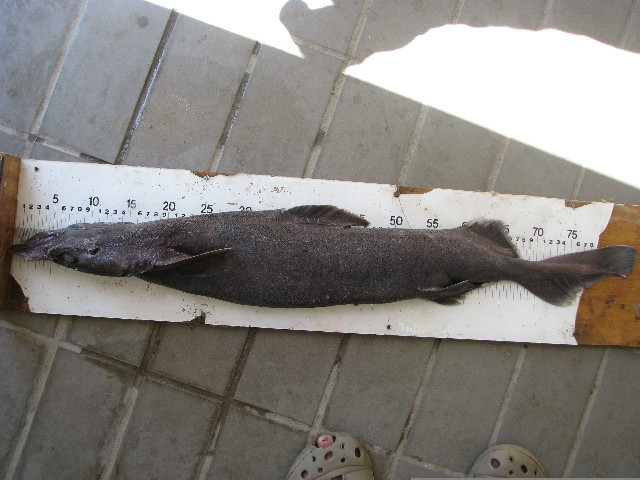

Conservation status
- Near Threatened (IUCN 3.1)

Scientific classification
- Kingdom: Animalia
- Phylum: Chordata
- Class: Chondrichthyes
- Subclass: Elasmobranchii
- Division: Selachii
- Order: Squaliformes
- Family: Centrophoridae
- Genus: Deania
- Species: D. calcea

Binomial name
- Deania calcea (R. T. Lowe, 1839)
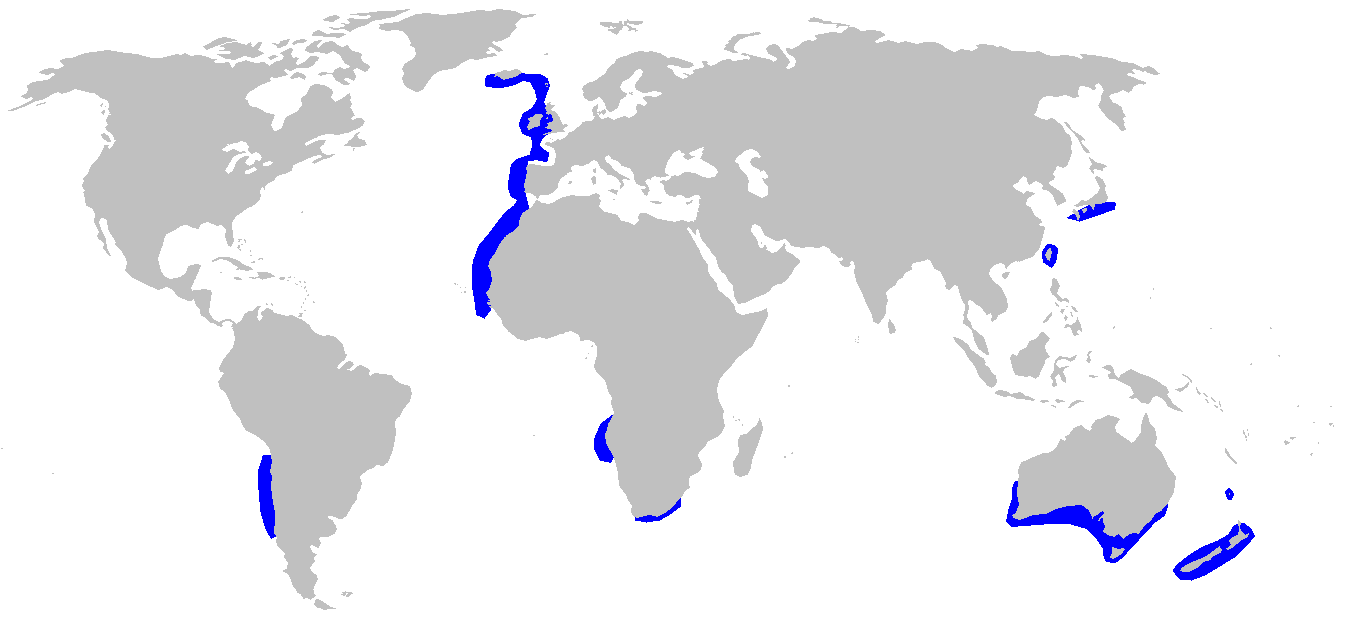
- Range of birdbeak dogfish (in blue)

= Birdbeak dogfish =

Species of shark

The birdbeak dogfish (Deania calcea) is a dogfish shark of the family Centrophoridae found in the Pacific Ocean around Honshū, Japan, southern Australia, New Zealand, and Chile, and in the Atlantic Ocean from Iceland south to the Cape of Good Hope.

The birdbeak dogfish has a very long, narrow snout, no anal fin, two long and low dorsal fins with grooved spines, small rectangular pectoral fins, and pitchfork-like denticles. It lives at depths between 73 and 1,450 m. It is ovoviviparous with up to 12 pups per litter. It eats pelagic bony fish, squid, octopus, and shrimp.

In June 2018 the New Zealand Department of Conservation classified the birdbeak dogfish as "Not Threatened" under the New Zealand Threat Classification System.

A study published in the Journal of the Marine Biological Association of the United Kingdom evaluated the reproductive strategy of the female deep-water shark birdbeak dogfish. This study found a strong association between mercury concentrations in pregnant females and those in their embryos, indicating maternal transfer of nutrients and a matrophoric strategy for the birdbeak dogfish that are ovoviviparous.

With the rise of fisheries, the birdbeak dogfish is being consumed at higher rates. It has been found to be a good source of minerals, such as potassium and sodium. However, there have been health risks associated with frequent consumption of female dogfish.
