= Southern Mandarin dogfish =

Conservation status
- Data Deficient (IUCN 3.1)

Scientific classification
- Kingdom: Animalia
- Phylum: Chordata
- Class: Chondrichthyes
- Subclass: Elasmobranchii
- Division: Selachii
- Order: Squaliformes
- Family: Squalidae
- Genus: Cirrhigaleus
- Species: C. australis

Binomial name
- Cirrhigaleus australis W. T. White, Last & Stevens, 2007
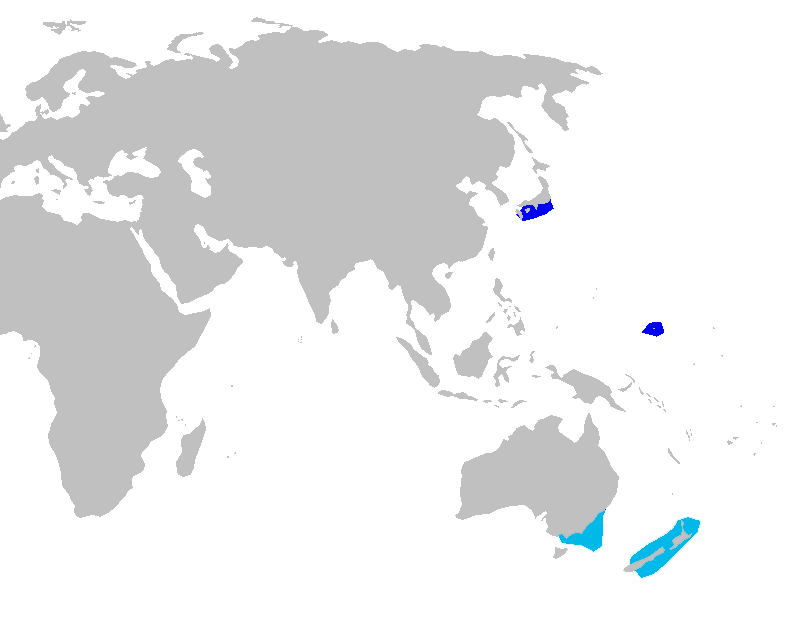
- This is the range of C. australis and C. barbifer. Australis is in light blue, and barbifer in dark blue.

Species of shark

The southern Mandarin dogfish (Cirrhigaleus australis) is a species of Mandarin dogfish shark in the genus Cirrhigaleus. It was distinguished from Cirrhigaleus barbifer, which lives in the North Pacific, on an expedition in the coral reefs near Australia in 2007. It is now known to live in the temperate waters in south-eastern Australia and from the Bay of Plenty region in New Zealand, at depths of 146–640 metres.

== Physical characteristics ==
It is medium-sized and robust compared to other dogfish. It is grey-brown above and pale below. The posterior margins of the pectoral and pelvic fins are white. This species of shark normally grow less than a metre long, but have been known to reach 1.25 metres. C. australis has smaller eyes, pectoral fins, dorsal fins, and spine than its cousin. The first dorsal fin is medium-sized and slightly raked. The second is similarly shaped, but a bit smaller. The pectoral fins are fairly large. Both dorsal spines are long. It also has strangely long barbels, giving it the name "Mandarin". There are about 115 centra along the back.

Scientists say the shark is harmless. Its defensive techniques are useless against many larger fish, and, as a consequence, it is very vulnerable to other sharks and fish. Also, the southern Mandarin dogfish has very low resilience, its population doubling only about every 14 years.

== Expedition ==
In 2007, a group of scientists from CSIRO spent some time searching the Eastern coast of Australia for new species. Along with the newly distinguished Cirrhigaleus australis, several hundreds of new marine species were discovered. Included were skates, sea stars, corals, bivalves, brachiopods, several types of marine arthropods, and many others.

They conducted research in three outings, each three weeks long. Two outings were in the Great Barrier Reef on Lizard Island and Heron Island, and the third was in the Ningaloo Reef on the northwest coast of Australia.

== Conservation status ==
In June 2018 the New Zealand Department of Conservation classified the southern Mandarin dogfish as "At Risk – Naturally Uncommon" with the qualifiers "Data Poor" and "Threatened Overseas" under the New Zealand Threat Classification System.
