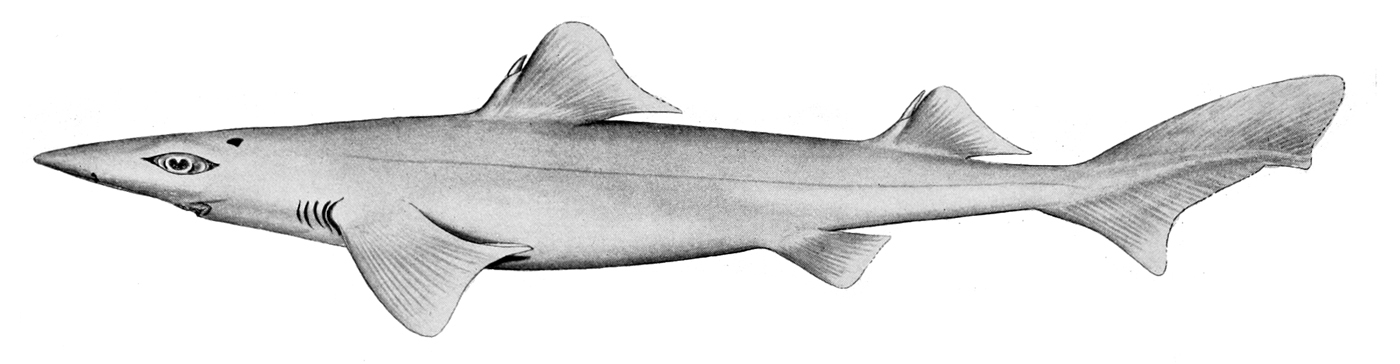

Conservation status
- Endangered (IUCN 3.1)

Scientific classification
- Kingdom: Animalia
- Phylum: Chordata
- Class: Chondrichthyes
- Subclass: Elasmobranchii
- Division: Selachii
- Order: Squaliformes
- Family: Centrophoridae
- Genus: Centrophorus
- Species: C. harrissoni

Binomial name
- Centrophorus harrissoni McCulloch, 1915
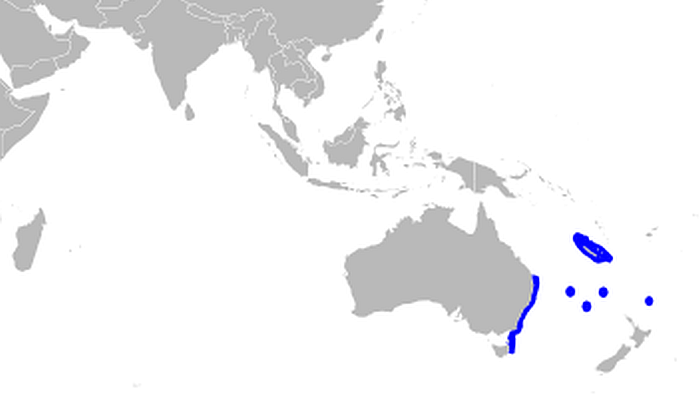
- Range of dumb gulper shark (in blue)

= Dumb gulper shark =

Species of shark

The dumb gulper shark (Centrophorus harrissoni) is a rare and endangered deepwater dogfish, found along the east coast of Australia and in isolated spots north and west of New Zealand. It is also known as the dumb shark, Harrison's deep-sea dogfish, or Harrison's dogfish.

== Characteristics ==
The dumb gulper shark may grow to be 43 in (110 cm) long and has a long, robust head, a long, flattened snout, a large mouth, and large, green eyes, which help it see at 820 to 1260 ft (250 to 385 m) under water. The body is slender and of moderate size, and is grey to greyish-brown in colour, with a paler underside. Of the two dorsal fins, the first is larger than the second, and each has a short spine, a white rear margin, and a dark blotch towards the front, which is more distinct in juveniles. The large caudal fin is asymmetrical, with a longer upper lobe compared to the lower lobe.

The broad teeth of this species differs between the upper and lower jaws, with the lower teeth being much larger. The teeth also differ between the male and female, with the male having much more erect, upright upper teeth, and upward-curving tips on the lower teeth. The dumb gulper shark is very similar in appearance to the closely related little gulper shark.

== Habitat ==
This shark is found off the coasts of eastern Australia and New Zealand. Its habitat is in the demersal zone on the upper to middle continental slope.

== Behaviour ==
These sharks eat mostly teleost fishes (particularly myctophids), cephalopods and crustaceans. Females produce a maximum of one to two pups every one to two years. Newborn pups range in size from 35 cm to 40 cm. Evidence suggests that the left-side uterus is less functional than the right-side. They can live up to 46 years on average.

== Population ==
The population size is unknown, but numbers have decreased as much as 99% in some areas since the 1970s. This species is harvested, by trawling or drop lining, for meat and liver oil (squalene). Upper-slope dogfish species are more vulnerable to capture than mid-slope species, because they are targeted throughout their vertical distribution and most of their local geographic distribution. The low reproductive rate, late age of maturity, and long lifespan typical of these sharks means they are likely unable to recover quickly after depletion.

== Conservation ==
Action is being taken to preserve the dumb gulper, which includes being incorporated into the Environmental Protection and Biodiversity Conservation (EPBC) Act to create a plan to keep this species safe. In response to this species' inherent low productivity and continuing reduced numbers, managers have introduced landing restrictions and area closures to enhance C. harrissoni stocks in southern Australian waters.

The New Zealand Department of Conservation has classified the dumb gulper shark as "Data Deficient" with the qualifier "Threatened Overseas" under the New Zealand Threat Classification System.
