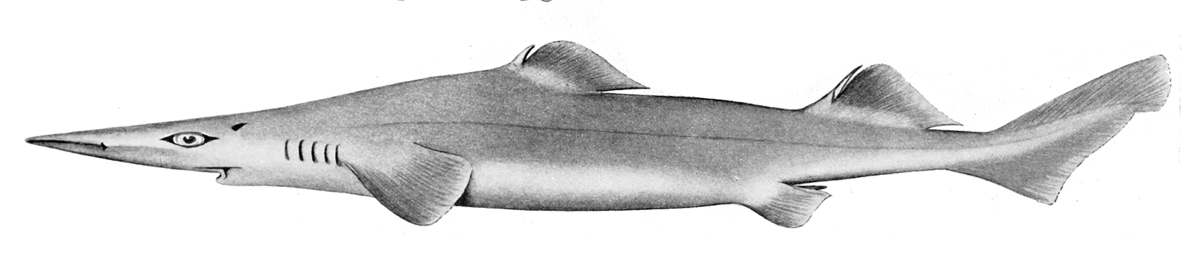
- Longsnout dogfish (Deania quadrispinosum)

Scientific classification
- Kingdom: Animalia
- Phylum: Chordata
- Class: Chondrichthyes
- Subclass: Elasmobranchii
- Division: Selachii
- Order: Squaliformes
- Family: Centrophoridae; Bleeker, 1859

Genera
- Centrophorus; Deania

= Centrophoridae =

Gulper sharks

Family of sharks

The Centrophoridae are a family of squaliform sharks. The family contains just two genera and about 15 species. They are sometimes called gulper sharks, but this is also the name of a specific species in the family, Centrophorus granulosus. These are generally deepwater fish. While some, such as the gulper shark C. granulosus, are found worldwide and fished commercially, others are uncommon and little-known. Their usual prey is other fish; some are known to feed on squid, octopus, and shrimp. Some species live on the bottom (benthic), while others are pelagic. They are ovoviviparous, with the female retaining the egg-cases in her body until they hatch.

They are small to medium sharks, ranging from 79 to 164 cm (2.59 to 5.38 ft) in adult body length. The members of the genus Deania generally have a long flattened snout.

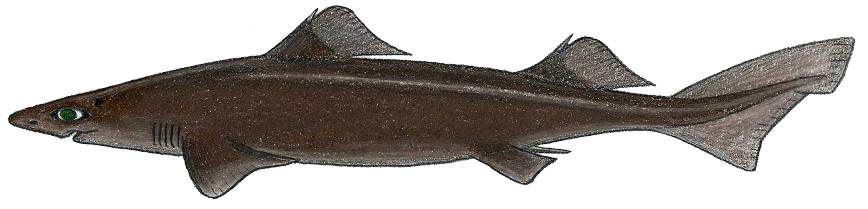
Gulper shark (Centrophorus granulosus)

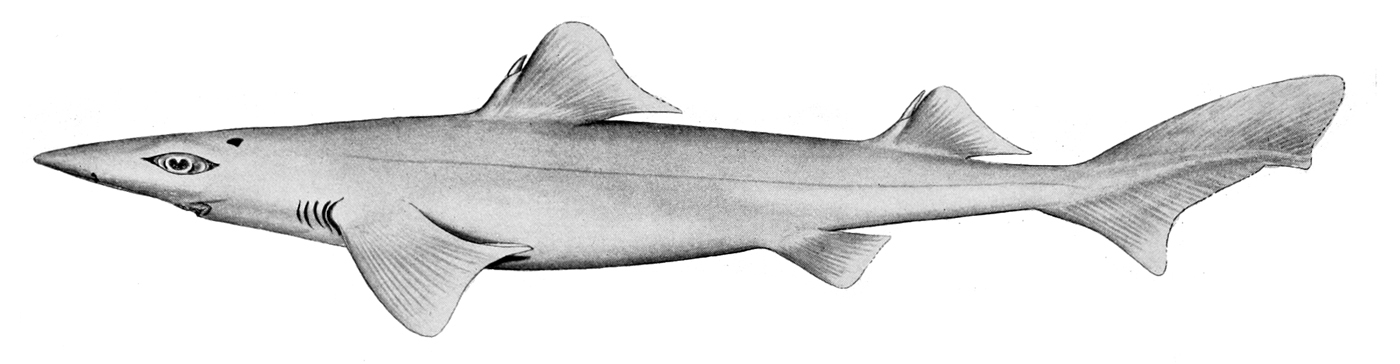
Dumb gulper shark (Centrophorus harrissoni)

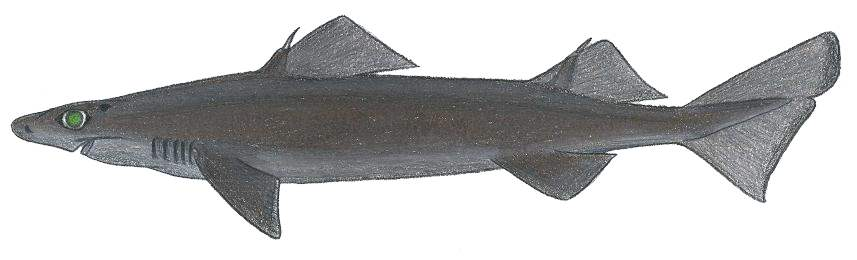
Leafscale gulper shark (Centrophorus squamosus)

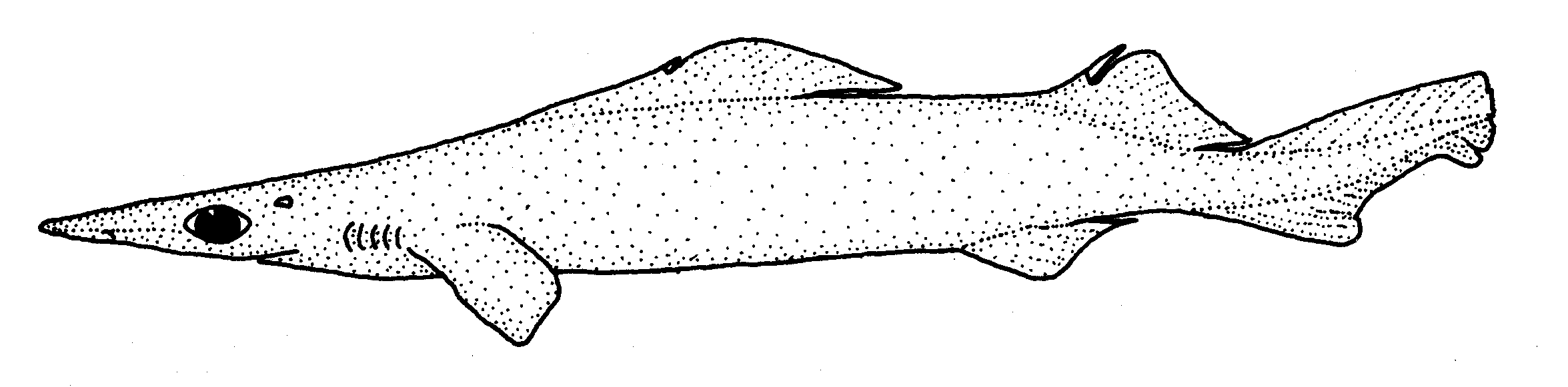
Birdbeak dogfish (Deania calcea)

== Species ==
The 18 known species are grouped into two genera:

- Centrophorus J. P. Müller & Henle, 1837
  - Centrophorus atromarginatus Garman, 1913 (dwarf gulper shark)
  - Centrophorus granulosus (Bloch & J. G. Schneider, 1801). (gulper shark)
  - Centrophorus harrissoni McCulloch, 1915 (dumb gulper shark)
  - Centrophorus isodon (Y. T. Chu, Q. W. Meng & J. X. Liu, 1981) (blackfin gulper shark)
  - Centrophorus lusitanicus Barbosa du Bocage & Brito Capello, 1864 (lowfin gulper shark)
  - Centrophorus moluccensis Bleeker, 1860 (smallfin gulper shark)
  - Centrophorus seychellorum Baranes, 2003 (Seychelles gulper shark)
  - Centrophorus squamosus (Bonnaterre, 1788) (leafscale gulper shark)
  - Centrophorus tessellatus Garman, 1906 (mosaic gulper shark)
  - Centrophorus uyato Rafinesque, 1810 (Little gulper shark)
  - Centrophorus westraliensis W. T. White, Ebert & Compagno, 2008 (western gulper shark)
  - Centrophorus zeehaani W. T. White, Ebert & Compagno, 2008 (southern dogfish)
  - Centrophorus sp. A (minigulper)
  - Centrophorus sp. B (slender gulper)
- Deania D. S. Jordan & Snyder, 1902
  - Deania calcea (R. T. Lowe, 1839) (birdbeak dogfish)
  - Deania hystricosa (Garman, 1906) (rough longnose dogfish)
  - Deania profundorum (H. M. Smith & Radcliffe, 1912) (arrowhead dogfish)
  - Deania quadrispinosa (McCulloch, 1915) (longsnout dogfish)
