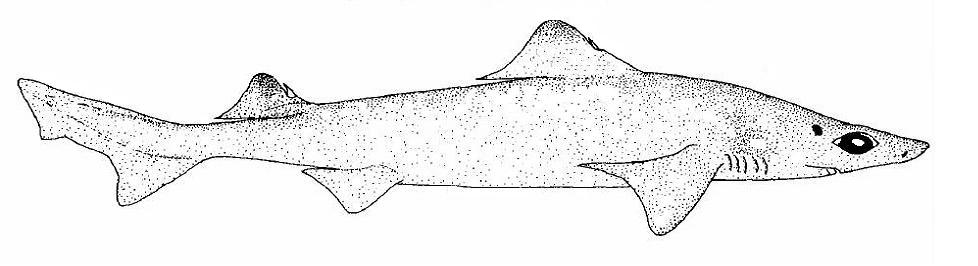

Conservation status
- Endangered (IUCN 3.1)

Scientific classification
- Kingdom: Animalia
- Phylum: Chordata
- Class: Chondrichthyes
- Subclass: Elasmobranchii
- Division: Selachii
- Order: Squaliformes
- Family: Centrophoridae
- Genus: Centrophorus
- Species: C. uyato

Binomial name
- Centrophorus uyato Rafinesque, 1810
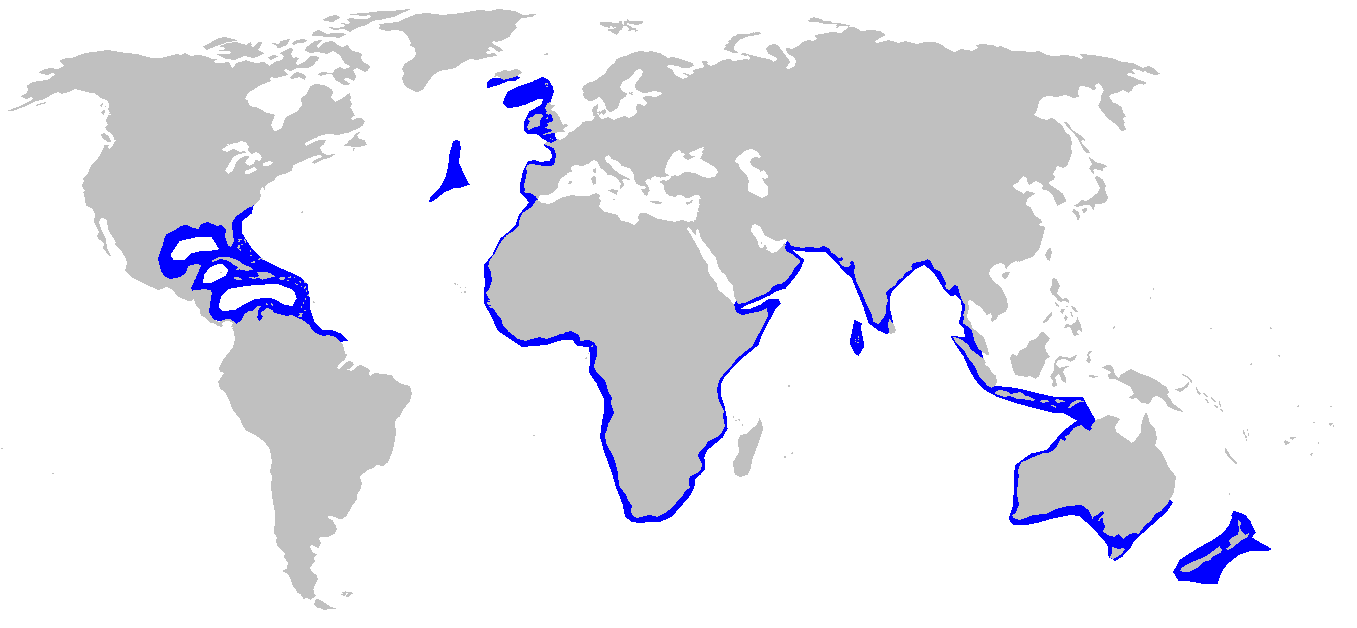
- Range of little gulper shark (in blue)

Synonyms
- Squalus uyato Rafinesque, 1810

= Little gulper shark =

Species of shark

The little gulper shark (Centrophorus uyato) is a small, deepwater dogfish of the family Centrophoridae.

== Physical characteristics ==
The little gulper shark has no anal fin, two dorsal fins with spines, slightly humped back before the first dorsal fin, darker areas of coloration above gills and on dorsal fins, long free rear tips on pectoral fins, and a notched caudal fin.

== Distribution ==
The little gulper shark lives in the northern Gulf of Mexico, the eastern Atlantic from Spain south to the Cape of Good Hope, the Mediterranean west of Sicily, the western Indian Ocean around Mozambique, Arabian Sea and Bay of Bengal around India, and possibly Taiwan.

== Habits and habitat ==
The little gulper is a common dogfish and lives near the bottom between 50 and 1,400 m. They are ovoviviparous with usually only one pup per litter. They eat bony fish and squid.
